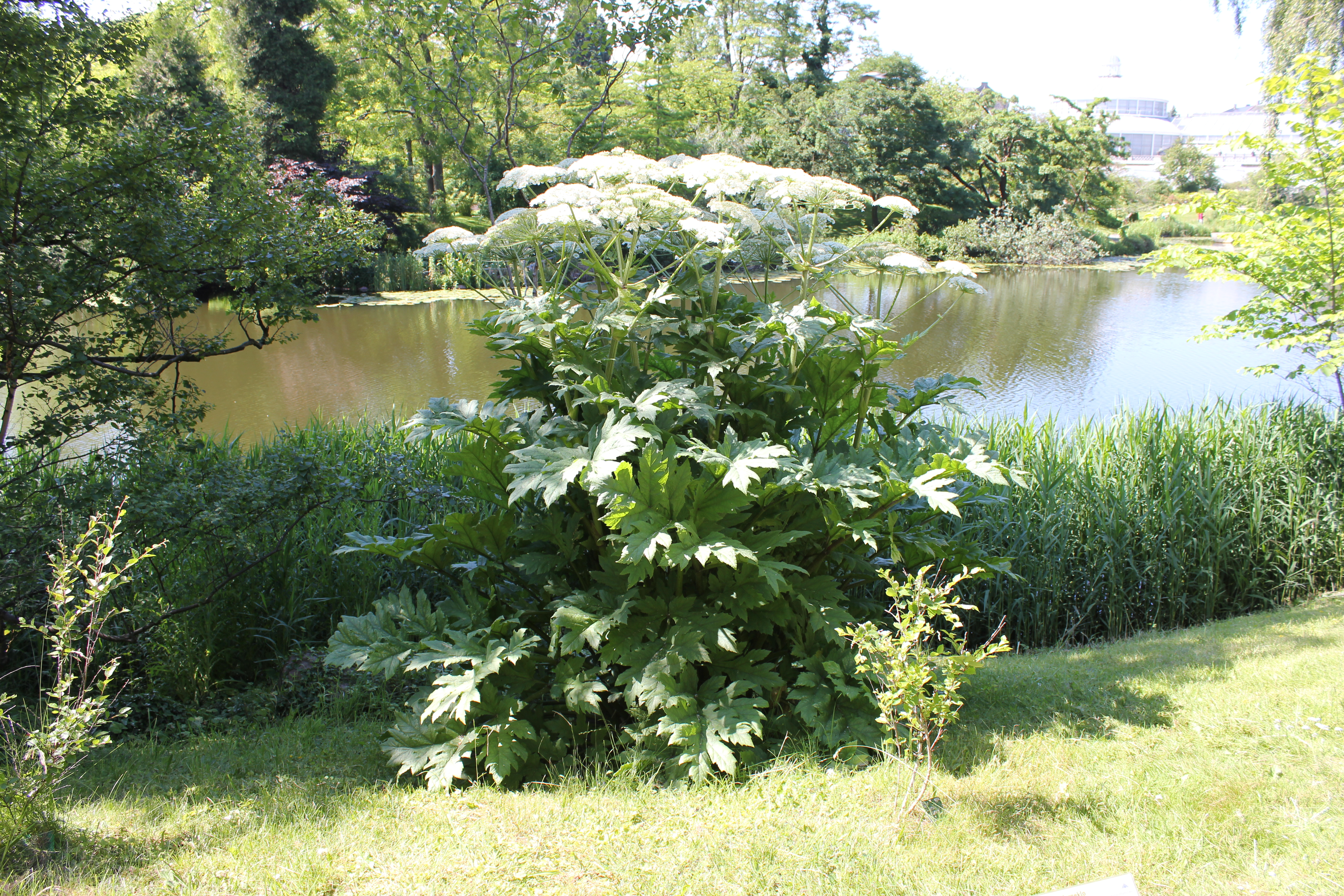

Scientific classification
- Kingdom: Plantae
- Clade: Tracheophytes
- Clade: Angiosperms
- Clade: Eudicots
- Clade: Asterids
- Order: Apiales
- Family: Apiaceae
- Genus: Heracleum
- Species: H. lehmannianum

Binomial name
- Heracleum lehmannianum Bunge

= Heracleum lehmannianum =

Species of plant

Heracleum lehmannianum is a large flowering plant species in the genus Heracleum, within the family Apiaceae. No subspecies are listed in the Catalogue of Life.

The species was first formally described by Alexander von Bunge and named after Russian botanist Alexander Lehmann.

== Properties ==
The plant has very large, jagged, pinnately compound leaves, and tall, deeply grooved flowering stems. Flowering umbels are very large, often having 45 to 50 rays.

This species is endemic to the Pamir-Alay mountain range, often seen at elevations of 1,500–2,400 m (4,920–7,870 ft) above sea level surrounding river valleys. The plant has been introduced to the British Isles.

The large inflorescences are highly conducive to honey production.

Heracleum lehmannianum is sometimes considered to be part of a species complex alongside Heracleum mantegazzianum, Heracleum persicum, Heracleum sosnowskyi and Heracleum asperum. Unlike the former three, it is not considered to be a noxious invasive species, and is still available from some retails, who consider it to have a lower phototoxicity. Mericarps can be processed to obtain 5-methoxypsoralen.
