= Noxious weed =

Harmful or invasive weed

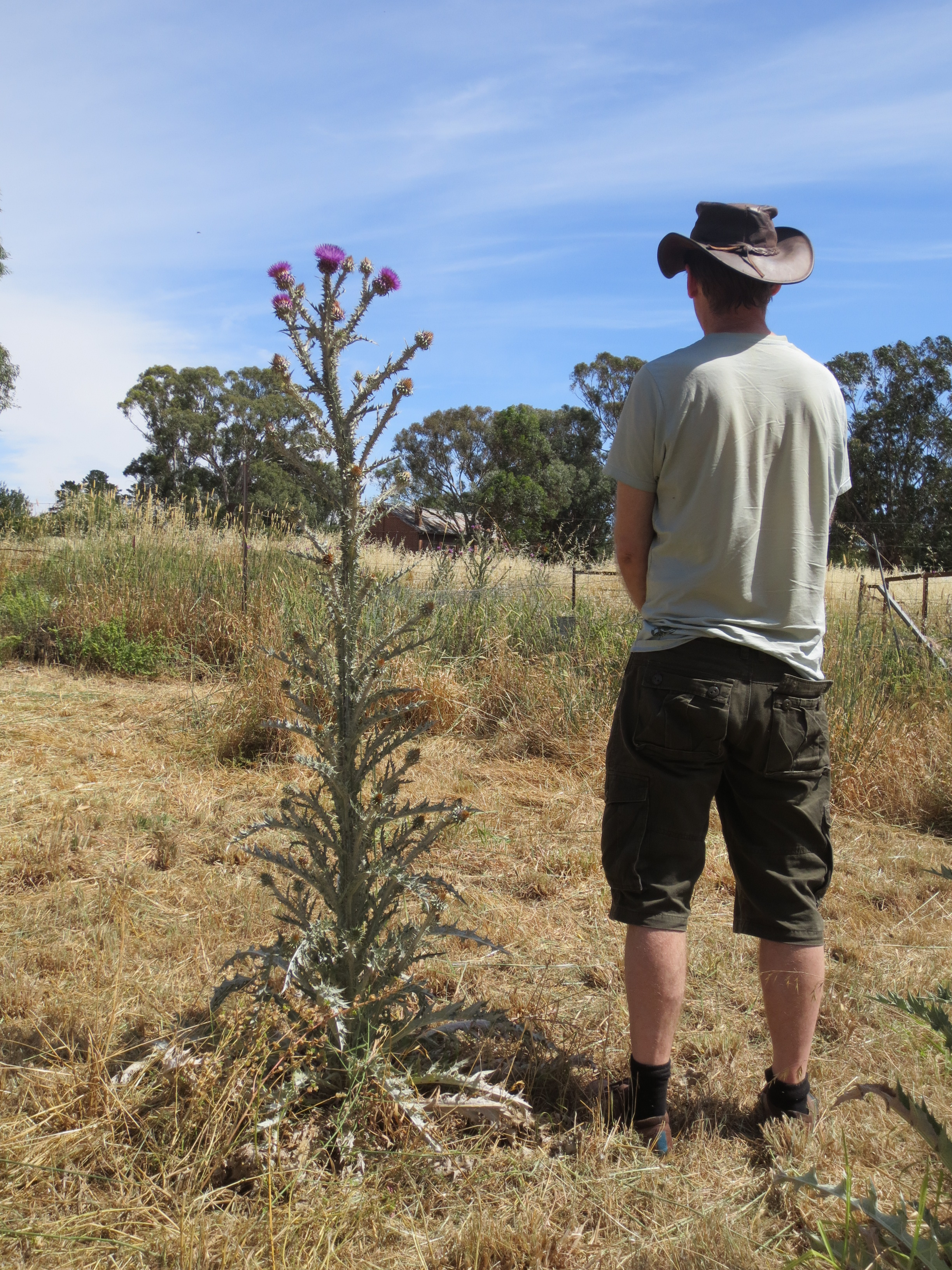
A mature cotton thistle, an invasive weed in Australia

A noxious weed, harmful weed or injurious weed is a weed that has been designated by an agricultural or other governing authority as a plant that is harmful to agricultural or horticultural crops, natural habitats or ecosystems, or humans or livestock. Most noxious weeds have been introduced into an ecosystem by ignorance, mismanagement, or accident. Some noxious weeds are native, though many localities define them as necessarily being non-native. Typically, they are plants that grow aggressively, multiply quickly without natural controls (such as native herbivores or soil chemistry), and cause adverse effects upon contact or ingestion. Noxious weeds are a major problem in many parts of the world, greatly affecting areas of agriculture, forest management, nature reserves, parks, and other open spaces.

Many noxious weeds have come to new regions and countries through contaminated shipments of feed and crop seeds, or have been intentionally introduced as ornamental plants for horticultural use.

Some "noxious weeds", such as ragwort, produce copious amounts of nectar, which is valuable for the survival of bees and other pollinators, as well as providing larval host foods and habitats. In the US, wild parsnip Pastinaca sativa, for instance, provides large, tubular stems that some bee species hibernate in, larval food for two different swallowtail butterflies, and other benefits.

== Types ==
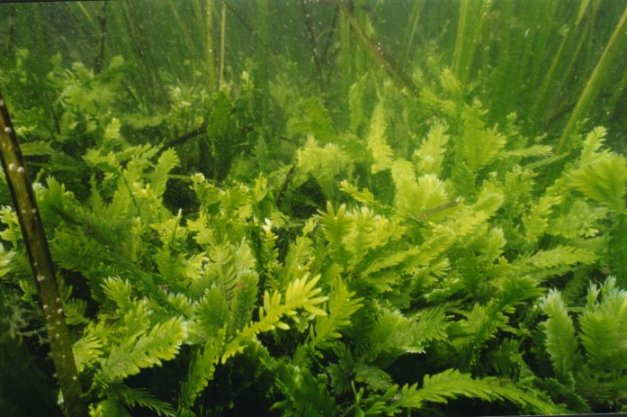
The alga Caulerpa taxifolia is a noxious marine weed nicknamed killer algae. This is a picture of it invading a native plant bed.

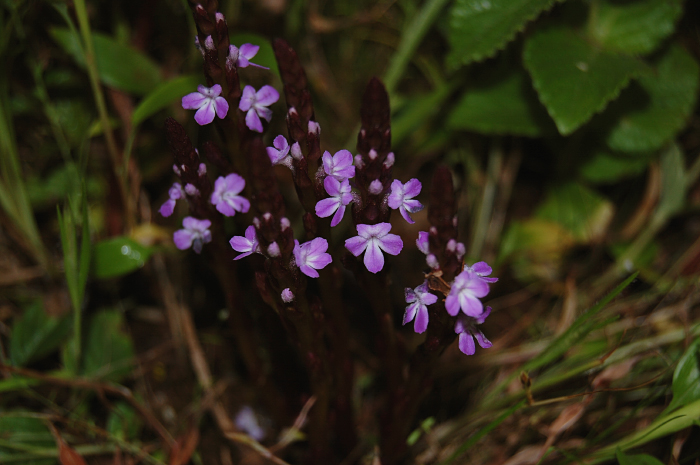
This is a parasitic noxious weed, Striga gesnerioides, the cowpea witchweed.

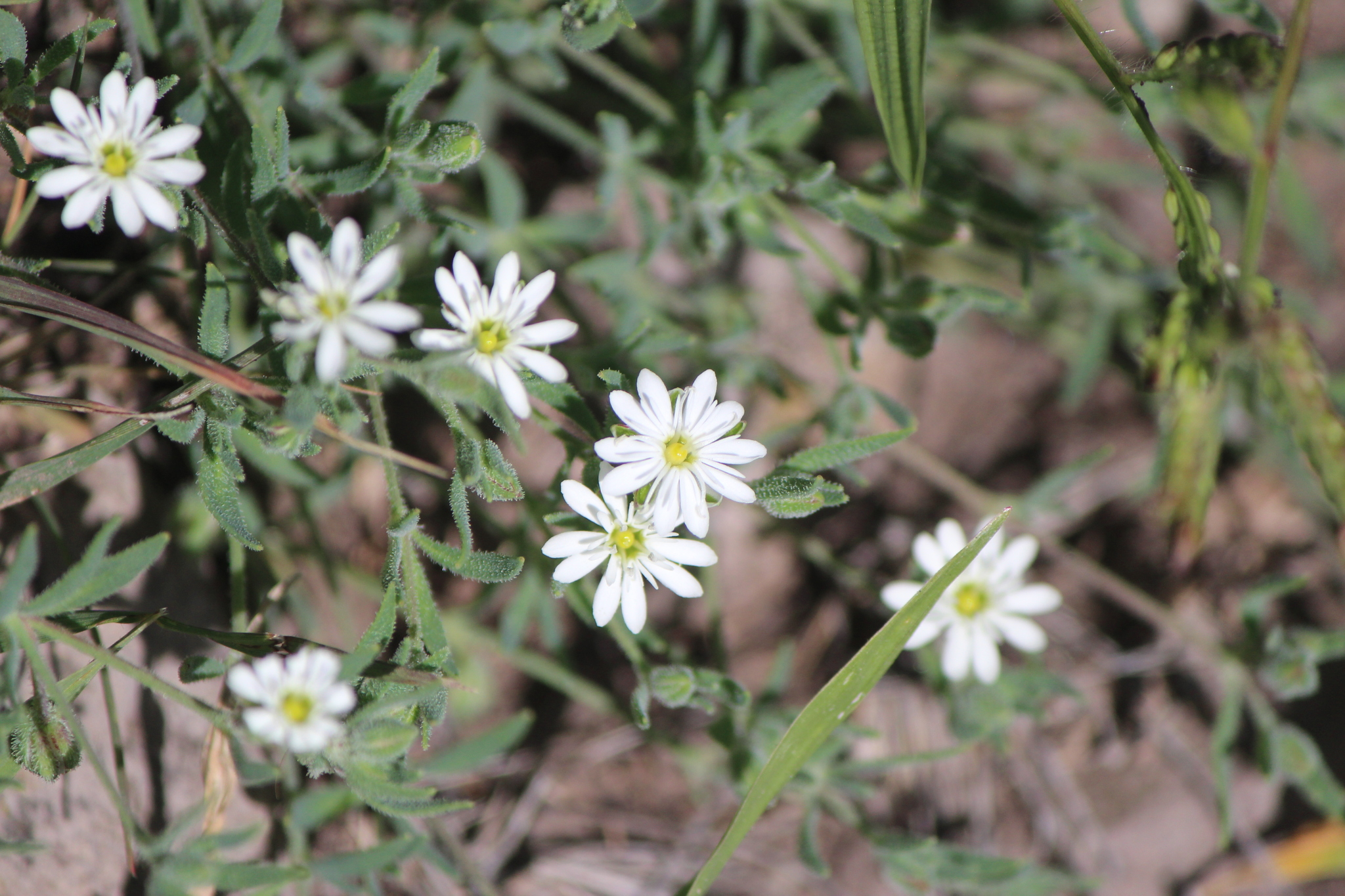
This is a terrestrial noxious weed, Drymaria arenarioides commonly called Lightning weed. It is sometimes confused with daisies.

Some noxious weeds are harmful or poisonous to humans, domesticated grazing animals, and wildlife. Open fields and grazing pastures with disturbed soils and open sunlight are often more susceptible. Protecting grazing animals from toxic weeds in their primary feeding areas is therefore important. There are marine, terrestrial, and parasitic noxious weeds.

== Control ==
Some guidelines to prevent the spread of noxious weeds are:

1. Avoid driving through noxious weed-infested areas.
2. Avoid transporting or planting seeds and plants that one cannot identify.
3. For noxious weeds in flower or with seeds on plants, pulling 'gently' out and placing them in a secure, closable bag is recommended. Disposal, such as hot composting or contained burning, is done when safe and practical for the specific plant. Burning poison ivy can be fatal to humans.
4. Using only certified weed-free seeds for crops or gardens.

Maintaining control of noxious weeds is important for the health of habitats, livestock, wildlife, native plants, and humans of all ages. How to control noxious weeds depends on the surrounding environment and habitats, the weed species, the availability of equipment, labor, supplies, and financial resources. Laws often require that noxious weed control funding from governmental agencies be used for eradication, invasion prevention, or native habitat and plant community restoration projects.

Insects and fungi have long been used as biological controls of some noxious weeds and more recently nematodes have also been used.

== Eradication ==
There are chemical, physical, and environmental ways of eradicating noxious weeds. Those include pulling the entire weed out of the ground, spraying herbicide if it's a large area, and using machines to turn over the soil. Using goats can prove a more ecological way of getting rid of noxious weeds, instead of using herbicides. Also, overplanting a native species is a long-term solution in eradicating noxious weeds.

== Controversy and biases ==
Agricultural needs, desires, and concerns do not always mesh with those of other areas, such as pollinator nectar provision. Ragwort, for instance, was rated as the top flower meadow nectar source in a UK study, and in the top ten in another. Its early blooming period is also particularly helpful in establishing bumblebee colonies. Thistles that are considered noxious weeds in the US and elsewhere, such as Cirsium arvense and Cirsium vulgare, have also rated at or near the top of the charts in multiple nectar production studies in the UK, one of its native locations. These thistles also serve as a larval host plant for the painted lady butterfly. There can, therefore, be a conflict between agricultural policy and the point of view of conservationists or other groups.

== By country ==
=== Australia ===
In Australia, the term "noxious weed" is used by state and territorial governments.

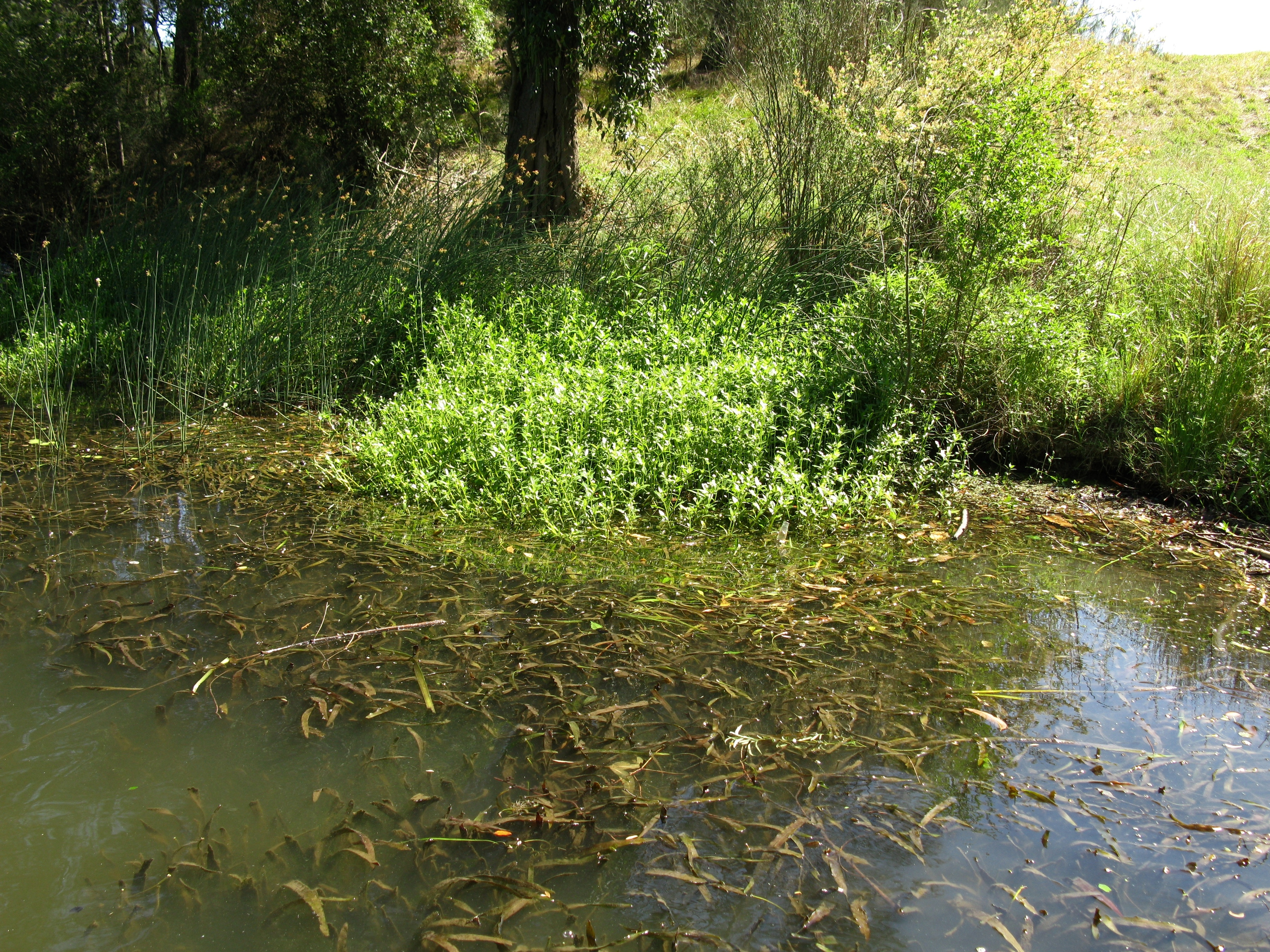
Mat of alligator weeds.

Some noxious weeds in Australia are alligator weeds, horsetails, and branched broomrape. The government of Victoria will get rid of all these plants for free. Alligator weeds are banned in all the states and territories of Australia. They can create large mats that can cause considerable blockages of waterways. Horsetails are poisonous to livestock. They are also extremely challenging to eradicate, as they can fragment and the fragments can grow new plants, much like succulents. Branched broomrapes are parasitic noxious weeds. They attach themselves to the roots of other plants and extract water and nutrients.

=== Canada ===
In Canada, constitutional responsibility for the regulation of agriculture and the environment is shared between the federal and provincial governments. The federal government through the Canadian Food Inspection Agency (CFIA) regulates invasive plants under the authority of the Plant Protection Act, the Seeds Act and statutory regulations. The CFIA has designated certain plant species as noxious weeds in the Weed Seeds Order.

Each province also produces its own list of prohibited weeds. In Alberta, for example, a new Weed Control Act was proclaimed in 2010 with two weed designations: "prohibited noxious" (46 species) which are banned across Alberta, and "noxious" (29 species) which can be restricted at the discretion of local authorities.

=== European Union ===
Since 2016, following the EU Regulation 1143/2014 on Invasive Alien Species (IAS), the European Commission publishes updated lists of IAS of Union concern. Since 2022 August 2 there are 41 plant species of Union concern.

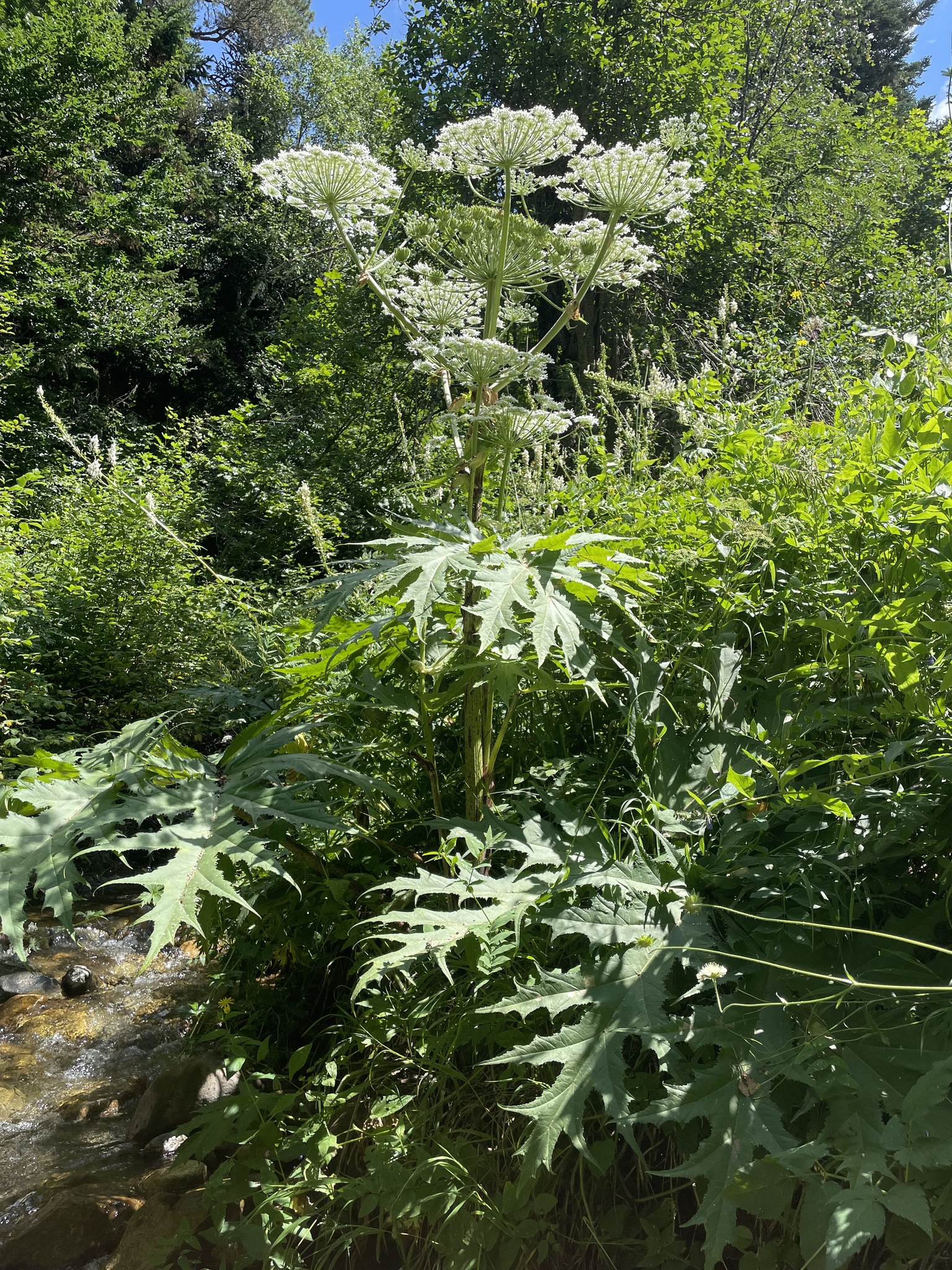
Giant hogweed

An example of highly invasive and phototoxic weeds are 3 related species of hogweed:

- Giant hogweed grows up to 5m tall. It has spread mostly across British Isles, Benelux, Germany, Czechia, Slovakia, Denmark, and also in some other parts of western and central Europe and Scandinavia.
- Sosnowsky's hogweed grows up to 5m tall. It has spread mostly in Poland, the Baltic states, and east of the EU border, and also in some parts of central Europe, as far as Germany and Denmark.
- Persian hogweed grows up to 2.5m tall. It is prevalent mostly in Scandinavia.

Active measures are being taken to stop their spread and possibly eradicate them from the European environment. The European Union funded the Giant Alien project to combat hogweed.

=== New Zealand ===
New Zealand has had a series of Acts of Parliament relating to noxious weeds: the Noxious Weeds Act 1908, the Noxious Weeds Act 1950, and the Noxious Plants Act 1978. The last was repealed by the Biosecurity Act 1993, which used words such as "pest", "organism" and "species", rather than "noxious". Consequently, the term "noxious weed" is no longer used in official publications in New Zealand. According to this Act, control of the majority of problem weeds, now called 'pest plants', is the responsibility of Regional Councils, or unitary authorities, in a few councils.

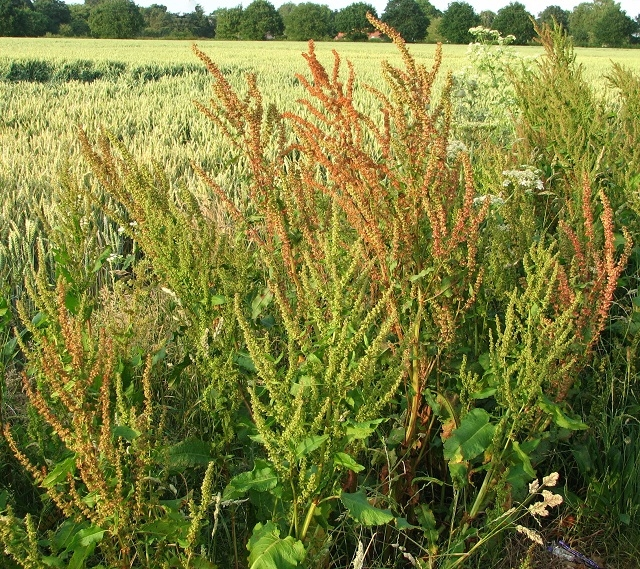
Broad-leaved dock.

Some common noxious weeds in New Zealand are broad-leaved dock, English ivy, and Oxalis. These plants may be aesthetically pleasing, but they smother native plants and are hard to eradicate.

=== United Kingdom ===
The Weeds Act 1959 (7 & 8 Eliz. 2. c. 54) covers Great Britain, It is mainly relevant to farmers and other rural settings rather than the allotment or garden-scale growers. Five "injurious" weeds are listed. The word "injurious" means, in this context, harmful to agriculture, not liable to cause injury. All the species listed apart from ragwort are edible and appear in Richard Mabey's book Food for Free. They are all native plants. These are:

- Spear thistle (Cirsium vulgare)
- Creeping, or field, thistle (Cirsium arvense)
- Curled dock (Rumex crispus)
- Broad-leaved dock (Rumex obtusifolius)
- Common ragwort (Jacobaea vulgaris)

The Department for Environment, Food and Rural Affairs (DEFRA) provides guidance for the removal of these weeds from infested land. Much of this is oriented towards the use of herbicides.

The act does not impose any automatic legal responsibility on landowners to control weeds or make growing them illegal, but they may be ordered to control them. Most common farmland weeds are not "injurious" within the meaning of the Weeds Act, and many such plant species have conservation and environmental value. The various UK government agencies responsible have a duty to seek a reasonable balance among different interests. These include agriculture, countryside conservation, and the general public.

Section 14 of the Wildlife and Countryside Act 1981 makes it an offence to plant or grow certain specified foreign invasive plants in the wild, listed in schedule 9 of the act, including Giant hogweed and Japanese knotweed. Some local authorities have by-laws controlling these plants. There is no statutory requirement for landowners to remove these plants from their property.

Northern Ireland is covered by the Noxious Weeds (Northern Ireland) Order 1977 (NISI 1977/52). This mirrors the Great Britain legislation, and covers the same five species, with the addition of:

- Wild oat (Avena fatua)
- Wild oat (Avena ludoviciana)

=== United States ===
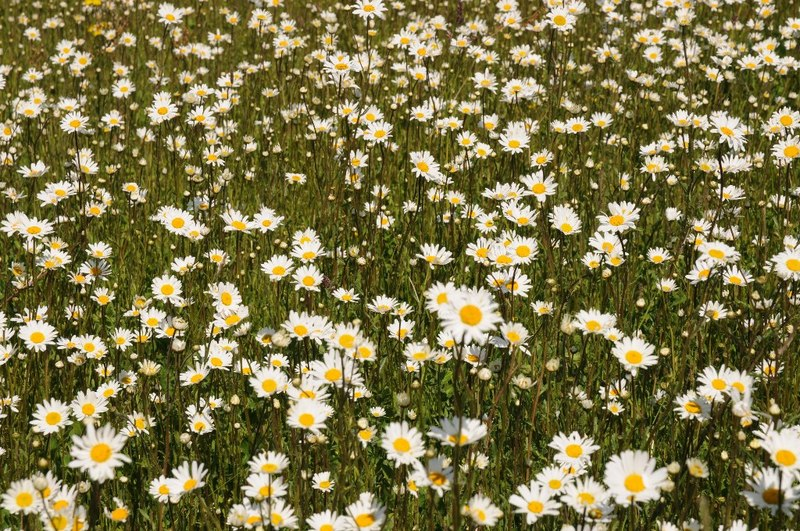
Ox-eye daisies.

The federal government defines noxious weeds under the Federal Noxious Weed Act of 1974. Noxious weeds are also defined by the state governments in the United States. Noxious weeds came to the U.S. by way of colonization. Some wildflowers are lesser known noxious weeds. A few of them are banned in certain states. For example, the Ox-eye daisy came to the Americas over in colonizers' seed bags and has become the common daisy seen at roadsides. It is prohibited in 10 states for agricultural use, and is the most heavily banned of any wildflower.

== See also ==
- Caulerpa taxifolia
- Invasive species
- International Plant Protection Convention
