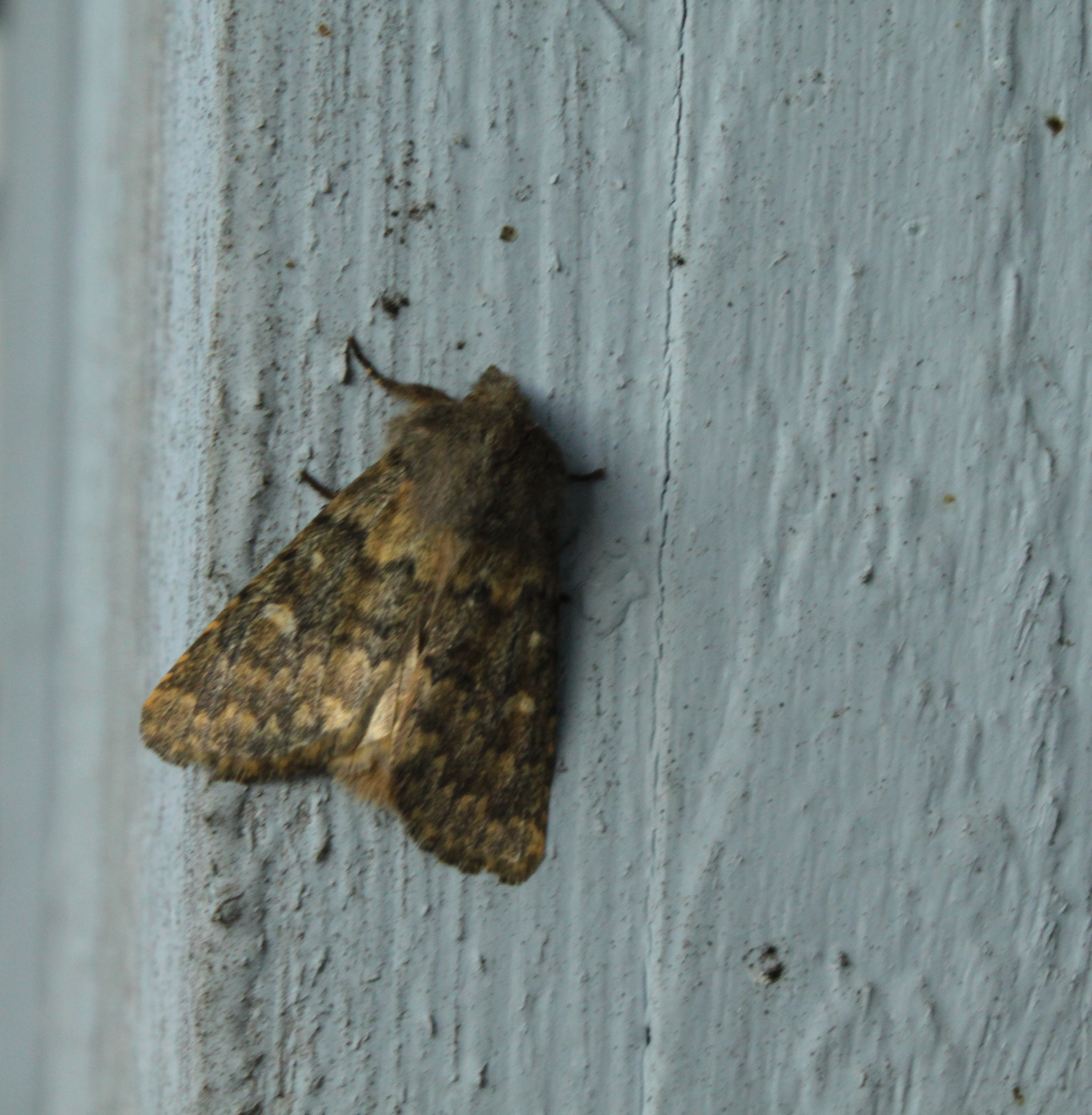

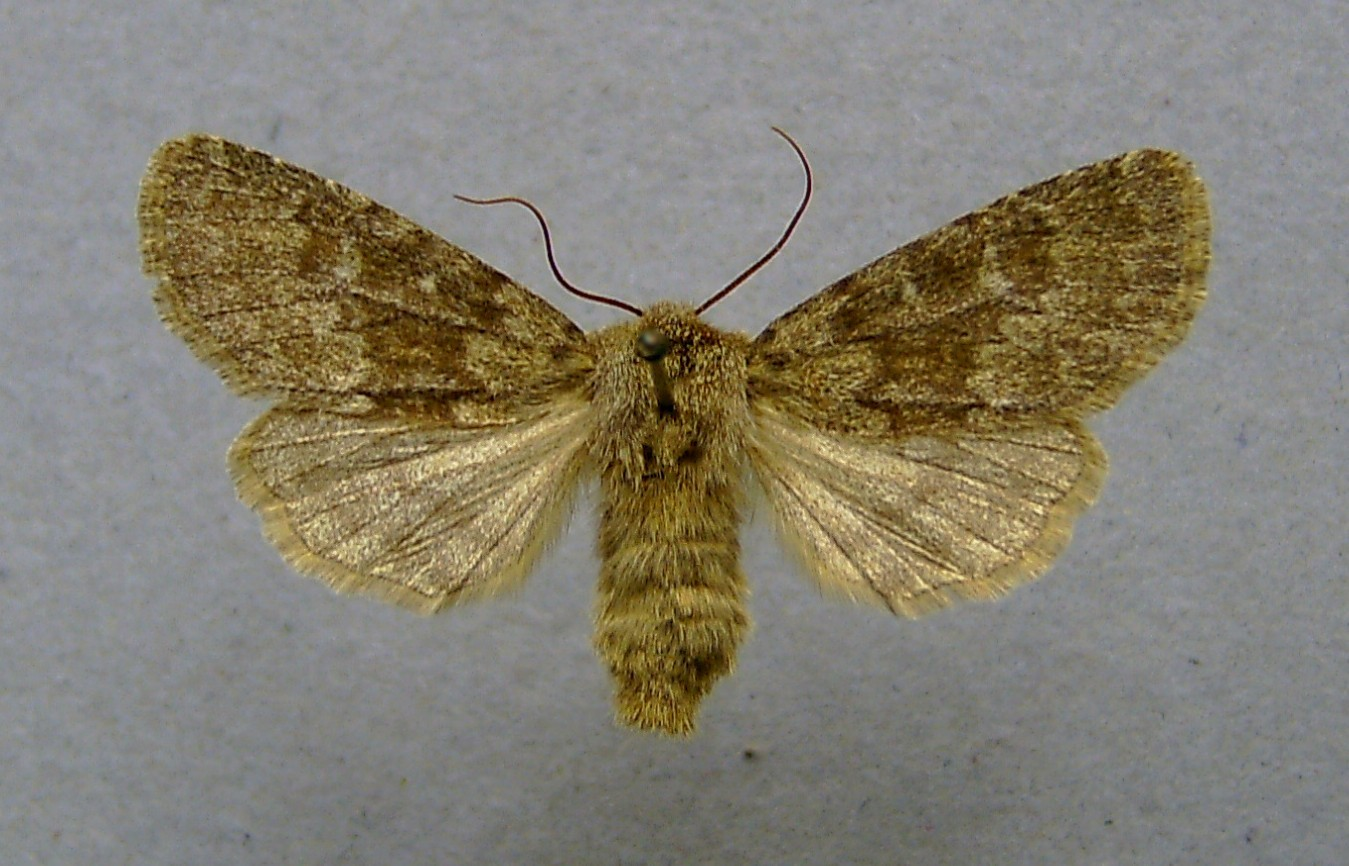

Scientific classification
- Kingdom: Animalia
- Phylum: Arthropoda
- Class: Insecta
- Order: Lepidoptera
- Superfamily: Noctuoidea
- Family: Noctuidae
- Genus: Dasypolia
- Species: D. templi

Binomial name
- Dasypolia templi (Thunberg, 1792)

Synonyms
- Noctua templi; Dasypolia ferdinandi var. caflischi

= Dasypolia templi =

Brindled ochre

Species of moth

Dasypolia templi, the brindled ochre, is a moth of the family Noctuidae. The species was first described by Carl Peter Thunberg in 1792. It is found in northern Europe up to central Siberia and more to the south in mountainous areas.

== Description ==
The length of the forewings is 18–23 mm. Forewing pale yellow grey in the male, simply pale grey in the female, densely dusted with darker: the lines diffusely darker still, outwardly edged with pale ground colour; median area often darker, the reniform, and sometimes the orbicular, showing paler; submarginal line pale, waved; fringe chequered, grey and yellowish; hindwing a little paler, with cellspot, outer, and sometimes a submarginal line greyer; — ab. alpina Ruehl. is an alpine form, with the ground colour more bluish grey, the stigmata picked out with chalk white, and the outer line of hindwing more strongly marked.

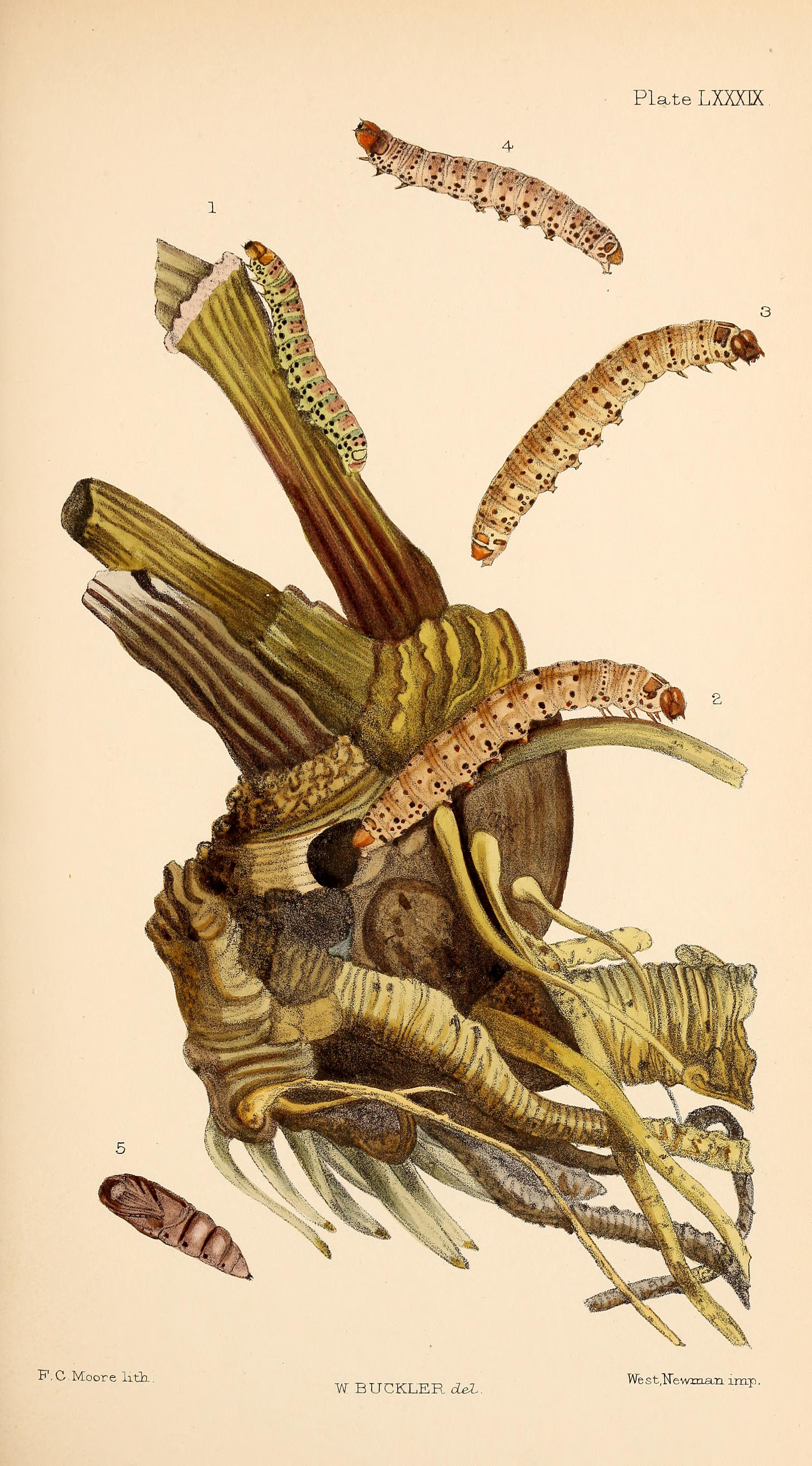
Figs.1, 2, 3, 4 larvae in various stages of growth 5 pupa in the stem etc of Heracleum sphondyleum See text of plate

== Biology ==
Larva yellowish grey, tinged dorsally with red; when fully grown, they are the peachy tan, with large tubercles; head, thoracic, and anal plates brown. The larvae feed on Aegopodium podagraria, Angelica sylvestris, Angelica archangelica v. litoralis, Levisticum officinale, Heracleum sphondylium and Heracleum laciniatum.

== Subspecies ==
The following subspecies are recognised:

- Dasypolia templi alpina
- Dasypolia templi variegata
- Dasypolia templi banghaasi
- Dasypolia templi calobrolucana
- Dasypolia templi powelli
- Dasypolia templi koenigi
- Dasypolia templi vecchimontium
- Dasypolia templi anatolica
- Dasypolia templi armeniaca
- Dasypolia templi hortensis
- Dasypolia templi centralasiae
- Dasypolia templi dushaki
