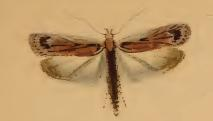

Scientific classification
- Kingdom: Animalia
- Phylum: Arthropoda
- Clade: Pancrustacea
- Class: Insecta
- Order: Lepidoptera
- Family: Depressariidae
- Genus: Depressaria
- Species: D. heydenii

Binomial name
- Depressaria heydenii Zeller, 1854

= Depressaria heydenii =

Species of moth

Depressaria heydenii is a moth of the family Depressariidae. It is found in France, Germany, Switzerland, Austria, Italy, Slovakia, Poland and Romania. It is an alpine species.

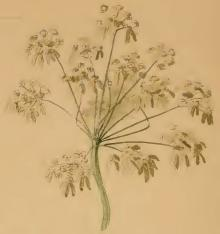
Larval web in an umbel of Heracleum sphondylium ssp. austriacum

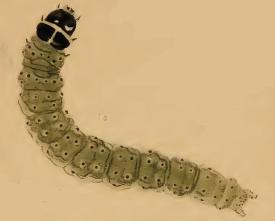
Larva

The larvae have been recorded feeding on Heracleum juranum, Heracleum austriacum, Heracleum sphondylium, Meum athamanticum and Laserpitium latifolium.
