= Austriacum =

Austriacum may refer to these species:

- Doronicum austriacum
- Heracleum austriacum
- Seseli austriacum
- Peucedanum austriacum

== See also ==
- Austria
