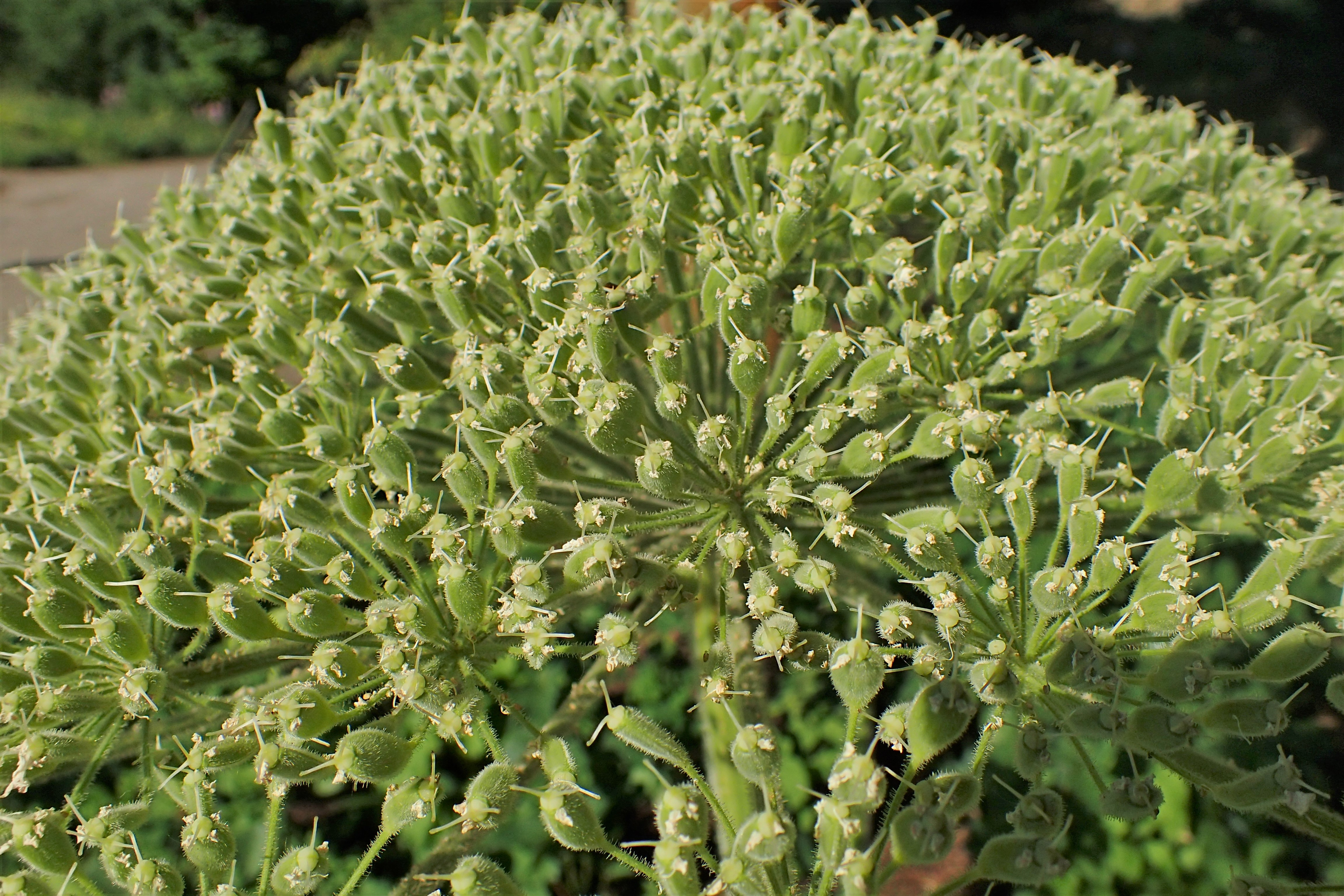

Scientific classification
- Kingdom: Plantae
- Clade: Embryophytes
- Clade: Tracheophytes
- Clade: Spermatophytes
- Clade: Angiosperms
- Clade: Eudicots
- Clade: Asterids
- Order: Apiales
- Family: Apiaceae
- Genus: Heracleum
- Species: H. platytaenium

Binomial name
- Heracleum platytaenium Boiss

Synonyms
- Heracleum eminens Lange; Hercleum spathyphyllum C. Koch ex Boiss

= Heracleum platytaenium =

Species of flowering plant

Heracleum platytaenium is a species of flowering plant in the family Apiaceae. It was first described by Swiss botanist Pierre Edmond Boissier. It is mostly found in the central and coastal regions of Anatolia in Turkey.

Heracleum platytaenium grows in mixed forests, rocky slopes, stream banks and coasts up to 1,500 meters (4,900 ft) above sea level. It blooms between May and July.
