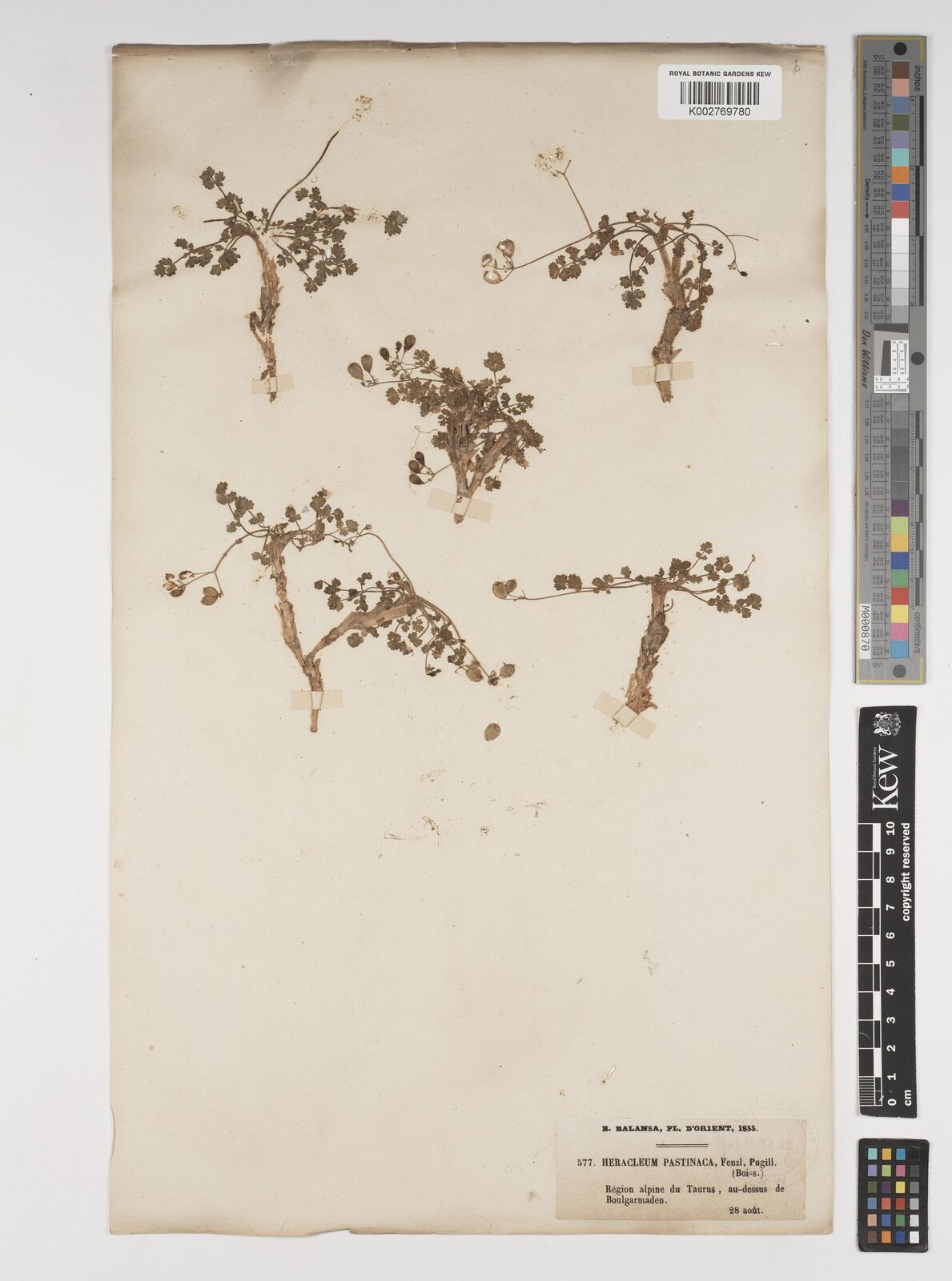

Scientific classification
- Kingdom: Plantae
- Clade: Tracheophytes
- Clade: Angiosperms
- Clade: Eudicots
- Clade: Asterids
- Order: Apiales
- Family: Apiaceae
- Genus: Heracleum
- Species: H. pastinaca

Binomial name
- Heracleum pastinaca Fenzl

= Heracleum pastinaca =

Species of flowering plant from Turkey

Heracleum pastinaca is a species of flowering plant native to Turkey.

== Description ==
Heracleum pastinaca is a perennial plant growing in the subalpine biome.
