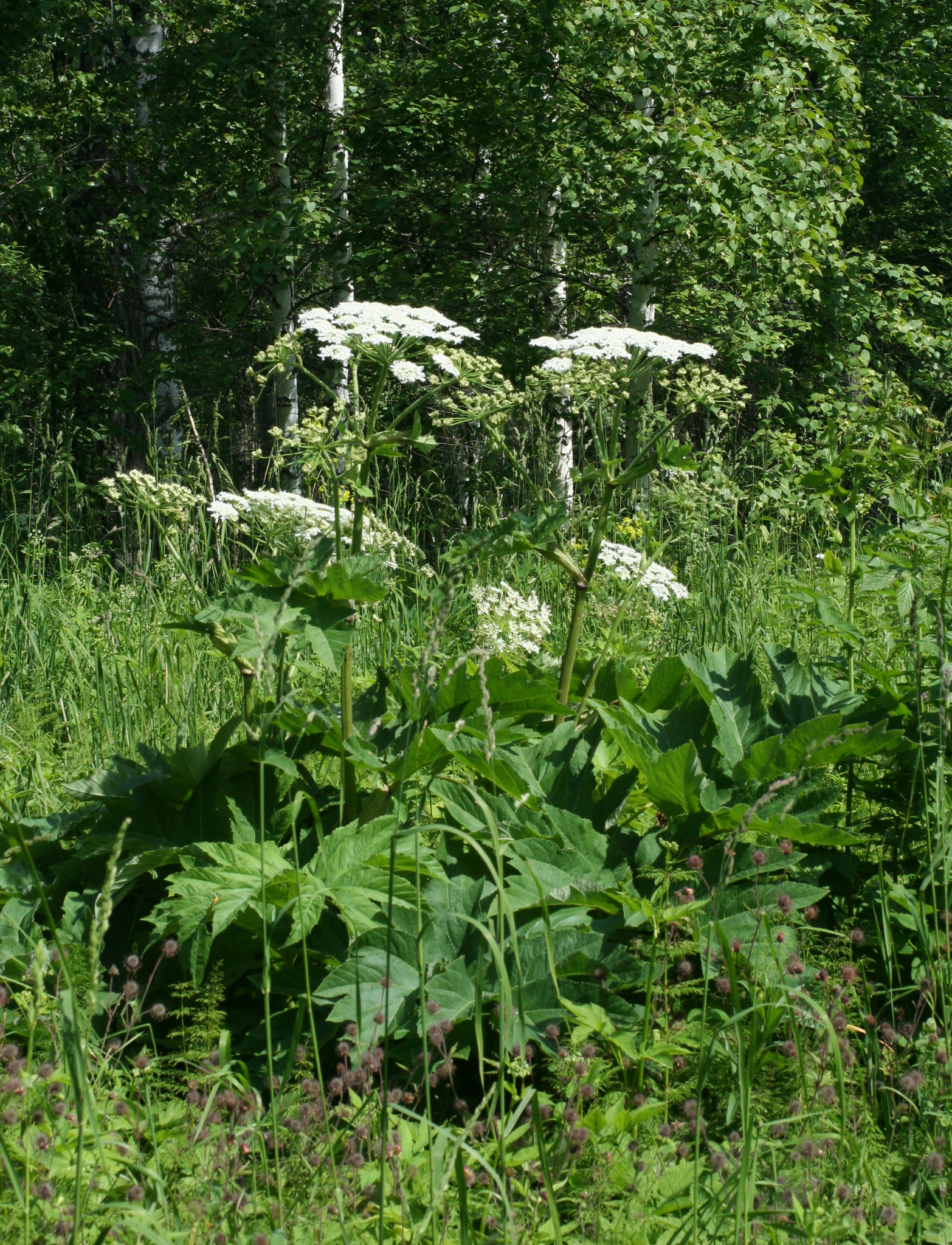

Scientific classification
- Kingdom: Plantae
- Clade: Tracheophytes
- Clade: Angiosperms
- Clade: Eudicots
- Clade: Asterids
- Order: Apiales
- Family: Apiaceae
- Genus: Heracleum
- Species: H. dissectum

Binomial name
- Heracleum dissectum Ledeb.

= Heracleum dissectum =

Species of flowering plant

Heracleum dissectum is a species of flowering plant in the family Apiaceae. It is found in Siberia and adjoining regions of northern Asia.

== Range ==
Heracleum dissectum grows in Central Asia, Russian Far East, and Northeast China. It grows primarily in the temperate biome.

== Taxonomy ==
Heracleum dissectum was first described by the German-Estonian botanist Carl Friedrich von Ledebour in 1829. Ledebour simultaneously described Heracleum barbatum, a name that is now considered to be a synonym of Heracleum dissectum Ledeb.

== Bibliography ==
- Ledebour, Carl Friedrich von (1829). Flora Altaica. Vol. 1. Berlin.
