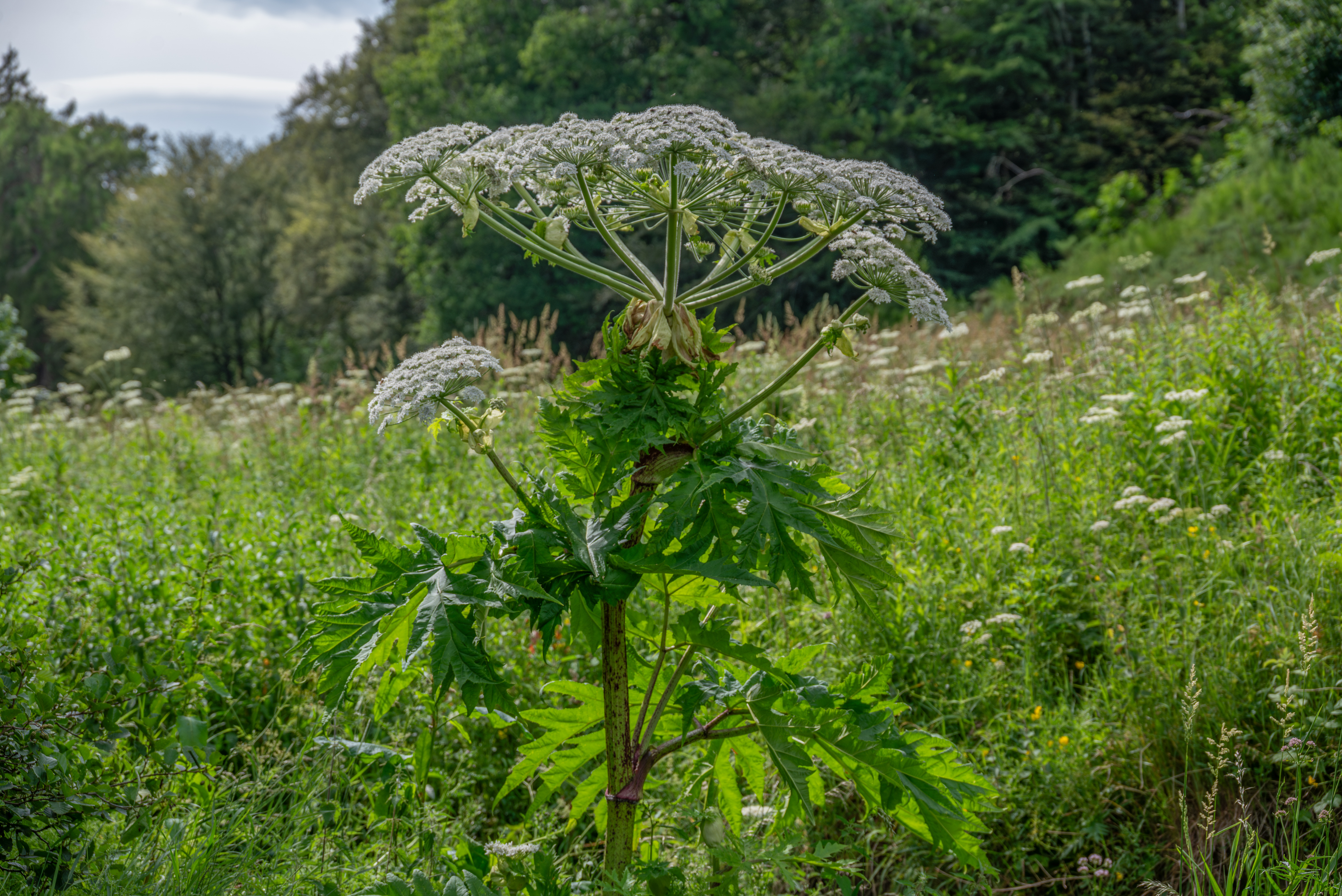
- Heracleum mantegazzianum in Moray, Scotland

Conservation status
- Least Concern (IUCN 3.1)

Scientific classification
- Kingdom: Plantae
- Clade: Tracheophytes
- Clade: Angiosperms
- Clade: Eudicots
- Clade: Asterids
- Order: Apiales
- Family: Apiaceae
- Genus: Heracleum
- Species: H. mantegazzianum

Binomial name
- Heracleum mantegazzianum Sommier & Levier

= Heracleum mantegazzianum =

Species of flowering plant

Heracleum mantegazzianum, commonly known as giant hogweed, is a monocarpic perennial herbaceous plant in the carrot family Apiaceae. H. mantegazzianum is also known as cartwheel-flower, giant cow parsley, giant cow parsnip, or hogsbane. In New Zealand, it is also sometimes called wild parsnip (not to be confused with Pastinaca sativa) or wild rhubarb.

Giant hogweed is native to the western Caucasus region of Eurasia. Introduced to Britain as an ornamental plant in the 19th century, it has also spread to other areas of Western Europe, as well as the United States, and Canada. Its close relatives, Sosnowsky's hogweed and Persian hogweed, have similarly spread to other parts of Europe.

The sap of giant hogweed is phototoxic and causes phytophotodermatitis in humans, resulting in blisters and scarring. These reactions are caused by furanocoumarin derivatives found in the leaves, roots, stems, flowers, and seeds of the plant. Consequently, many regions consider it a noxious weed.

== Etymology ==
The genus name Heracleum is from Latin: Hēraclēus, the Latin rendering of Ancient Greek: Ἡράκλειος : Hērákleios 'Hercules', in reference to the giant nature of hogweeds.

The species name mantegazzianum refers to Paolo Mantegazza (1831–1910), Italian traveller and anthropologist.

== Description ==
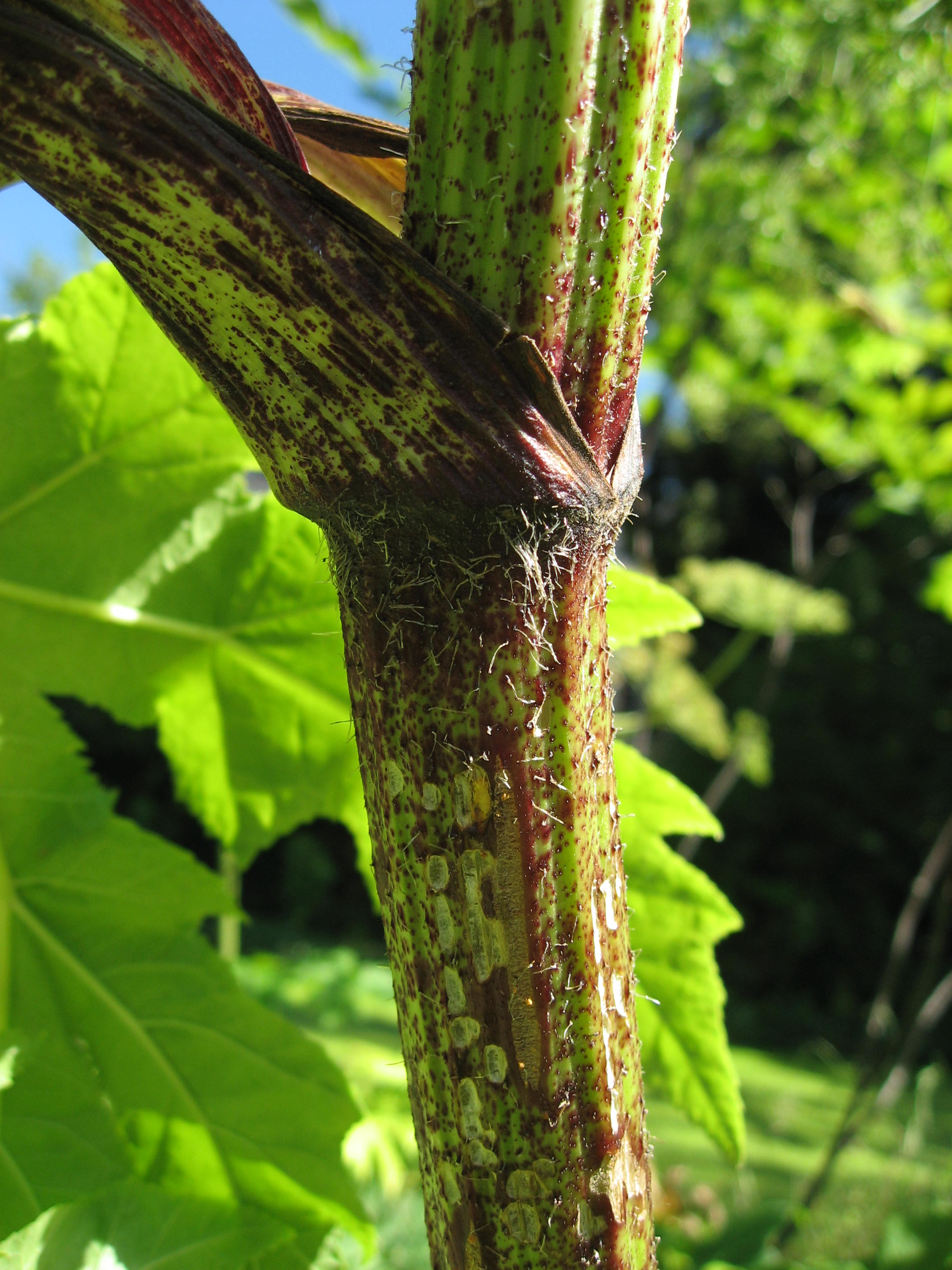
Green, red-spotted stem with white hairs

Giant hogweed typically grows to heights of 2 to 5 m (6 1/2 to 16 1/2 ft). Under ideal conditions, a plant can reach a height of 5.5 m (18 ft). The leaves are incised and deeply lobed. A mature plant has very large leaves, 1–1.5 m (3 1/2–5 ft) wide, sometimes even up to 2.6 m (8.5 ft) wide and up to 3 m (9.8 ft) long and a stout, bright green stem with extensive dark reddish-purple splotches and prominent coarse white hairs, especially at the base of the leaf stalk. The hollow, ridged stems are 3–8 cm (1–3 in) in diameter, occasionally reaching 12.5 centimetres (5 in) diameter, and can grow to more than 4 m (13 ft) high. Dark red spots on the stem each surround a single hair. The umbrella-shaped inflorescence, known as a compound umbel, can reach a diameter of up to 100 cm (3 1/2 ft) across its flat top. The flowers are white or greenish white and may be radially symmetrical or strongly bilaterally symmetrical (zygomorphic). The fruit is a schizocarp, producing dry, flattened, oval seeds in pairs. The seeds are approximately 1 cm (1/2 in) long, with a broadly rounded base and broad marginal ridges. They are coloured tan with brown lines (so-called oil tubes) running 3/4 of the seed's length.

=== Life cycle ===
The life cycle of giant hogweed consists of four phases:

1. Pre-flowering plants: In the first year, leaves sprout from the seed. In subsequent years, leaves grow from the overwintering roots, producing a rosette of leaves at ground level with no above-ground stem. This pre-flowering phase can last for several years.
2. Flowering plants (midsummer): After several years of growth, the plant flowers, sending up an erect stem from the rootstock.
3. Seeds (late summer/early autumn): A flowering plant can produce 20,000 seeds.
4. Dead stems (late autumn/winter): After producing seeds, the plant dies, leaving dried stems and seed heads standing; the seeds slowly fall and are dispersed by wind and animals.

Emerging seedlings tend to be morphologically diverse, with jagged pinnate forms and more rounded leaf shapes being sighted almost always occurring within the same seed bank. During the first few years of growth, the leaves and stem of a pre-flowering plant die back over winter. In spring, the plant grows back from its root. In other words, the giant hogweed is a herbaceous perennial.

A giant hogweed plant usually produces a flowering stalk in 3–5 years, but plants may take up to eight years to flower if conditions are unfavourable. In the Czech Republic, a single plant reached twelve years old before flowering. In any case, when the plant finally flowers, it does so between June and July (in the northern hemisphere).

Seeds are typically produced in August. On average, a single flowering plant will produce 20,000 seeds with seed production varying between 10,000 and 50,000 seeds per plant.

Giant hogweed is a monocarpic perennial. This means that after a mature plant flowers and produces seeds, the entire plant dies. During the following winter, the tall dead stems mark the locations where the flowering plants once stood.

The seeds are dispersed over short distances by the wind, but they can also be carried over longer distances by water, animals, and people. Most seeds (95%) are found within the top 5 cm (2 in) of soil, a few metres of the parent plant. Seeds may remain viable in the seedbank for over five years.

A seed deposited in the seed bank is initially dormant. Dormancy is broken by the cold, wet conditions of autumn and winter. Therefore, freshly deposited seeds remain dormant until at least the following spring, when approximately 90% of them will germinate. The rest remain dormant in the seed bank.

Seeds normally result from cross-pollination between two or more plants, but self-pollination is also possible. More than half of the seeds produced by self-pollination will germinate and give rise to healthy seedlings, so a single isolated seed can lead to the formation of a new colony of plants.

=== Similar species ===
The various species of the genus Heracleum are similar in appearance, but vary in size. H. mantegazzianum is among the tallest, typically reaching 4 m (13 ft) high (and sometimes more than 5 m or 16 ft high), whereas Heracleum species native to western Europe, such as H. sphondylium ([common] hogweed), or North America, such as H. maximum (cow parsnip), rarely exceed 3 m (10 ft) high. There are considerable differences in the size of the umbel, leaves, and stem of H. mantegazzianum as well.

The following table compares H. mantegazzianum and H. maximum by feature:

	H. mantegazzianum (giant hogweed)	H. maximum (cow parsnip)	H. sphondylium ([common] hogweed)
Height	Typically 3 to 4.5 m (10 to 15 ft) tall	Up to 2.5 m (8 ft) tall	Up to 2 m (6 1/2 ft) tall, rarely 2.5 m
Leaves	Compound, lobed leaves typically 100 cm (3 1/2 ft) wide, up to 150 cm (5 ft) wide; mature leaf has deep incisions and serrated edges	Compound, lobed leaves up to 60 cm (2 ft); mature leaf is less incised with less jagged edges	Compound, lobed leaves up to 60 cm (2 ft); mature leaf is with rounded, less jagged edges, hairy
Stem	Green stems from 3–8 cm (1–3 in) in diameter, occasionally up to 10 cm (4 in) in diameter, with dark reddish-purple splotches and coarse white hairs at the base of the leaf stalk	Green ridged stems up to 5 cm (2 in) in diameter with fine white hairs (no purple splotches)	Grey-green ridged stems up to 3 cm (1 in) in diameter, coarsely hairy (no purple splotches)
Flowers	White umbel is typically 80 cm (2 1/2 ft) in diameter, up to 100 cm (3 1/2 ft) in diameter, with 50–150 flower rays per umbel; flowers from mid-June to mid-July	White umbel up to 30 cm (1 ft) in diameter with 15–30 flower rays per umbel; flowers from late May to late June	White (occasionally pinkish) umbel up to 25 cm (1 ft) in diameter with 12–25 flower rays per umbel; flowers from June to September (sometimes as early as April)
Fruit	Narrower oval fruit 9–11 mm long	Heart-shaped fruit	Broad oval fruit 7–10 mm long

Many more species exist; in Europe alone, there are over 20 species of the genus Heracleum. Few of these reach a similar size, and several are phototoxic to a lesser degree. However, two other species, H. sosnowskyi and H. persicum, do reach similar sizes, and are equally noxious. These three species, alongside H. lehmannianum and H. asperum, are sometimes grouped into a single species complex.

== Distribution ==
Distribution of invasive populations of giant hogweed in Europe (2005)

Giant hogweed is widespread throughout western and northern Europe, especially along terrains such as coastal areas and riverbanks. By forming dense stands, it can displace native plants and reduce wildlife habitats. It has spread in the northeastern and northwestern United States and southern Canada, and is an invasive species across western Europe; in sites where it has settled, it overtakes the local native species, H. sphondylium.

In Canada, the plant occurs in most provinces, except in the prairies. It has been present in Quebec since the early 1990s. The plant's spread in Ontario began in the southwest and it was first observed in the Greater Toronto Area and Renfrew County near Ottawa in 2010.

In the US, giant hogweed occurs in Maine, Wisconsin, and south to Indiana, Michigan, Maryland, and New Jersey. In June 2018, it was reported growing in Virginia and North Carolina. The plant is federally listed as a noxious weed in the US.

While not widespread throughout the continent, localized populations have been noted in southern Australia.

The closely related hogweed Heracleum sosnowskyi is widespread in Russia and the Baltic states, and present in eastern Europe.

=== History ===
Heracleum mantegazzianum is native to the western Caucasus region of Eurasia. Because of its impressive size, giant hogweed was brought to Europe and North America as an ornamental plant and garden curiosity.

The following historical information grew out of the European Giant Alien Project, which began in 2005.

==== Migration across Europe ====
Heracleum mantegazzianum was first described in scientific literature in 1895, but by that time, the plant had been imported as an 'ornamental curiosity' by more than a dozen European countries. The first recorded introduction of H. mantegazzianum was first recorded in Great Britain in 1817, when it appeared on the seed list at the Kew Botanic Gardens in London. The first natural population was recorded in 1828, growing wild at Shelford in Cambridgeshire.

The spread of H. mantegazzianum throughout Europe continued unabated until the mid-20th century, by which time the dangers posed by giant hogweed had become better known. Despite these warnings, however, the plant continued to be used by gardeners, beekeepers, and farmers (for cattle fodder) for another 50 years. Heracleum mantegazzianum was finally delisted by the Royal Horticultural Society of Great Britain in 2002.

==== Introduction to North America ====
During the 20th century, giant hogweed was brought to the US and Canada to be displayed in arboretums and Victorian gardens. The earliest recorded instance of its planting in North America was in 1917 in gardens near Highland Park in the city of Rochester, New York.

Giant hogweed first appeared in southern Ontario by 1950, and within a quarter of a century the plant had become firmly established there. The first collections were made in Nova Scotia in 1980 and in Quebec in 1990. Giant hogweed remained on sale in Canadian nurseries until 2005.

On the west coast of North America, H. mantegazzianum appeared in Oregon, Washington, and southwestern Canada, but it is unclear how the species arrived in this region. The first reports of giant hogweed in British Columbia date back to the 1930s.

==== Russia ====
Heracleum mantegazzianum has not spread in Russia. Another similar very large hogweed species, H. sosnowskyi, also native to the Caucasus region, was introduced into Russian agriculture starting from 1947 as a fodder plant and later spread extensively on its own throughout Russia and some other countries of eastern Europe.

== Ecology ==
=== As an invasive plant ===
Because of its phototoxicity and invasive nature, giant hogweed is often actively removed. The European Union funded the Giant Alien project to combat the plant. On 2 August 2017, it added the species to its List of invasive alien species of Union concern, thus placing restrictions on keeping, importing, selling, breeding and growing it, and requiring governments to detect and eradicate it throughout the EU. In the United Kingdom, the Wildlife and Countryside Act 1981 makes it an offence to plant or cause giant hogweed to grow in the wild.

In the US, hogweed is regulated as a federal noxious weed, and it is illegal to import it into the US or move it across state borders without a permit from the Department of Agriculture (USDA). The New York State Department of Environmental Conservation has had an active program to control giant hogweed since 2008. In 2011, Maine state horticulturists reported that it has been found at 21 locations in Maine, with the number of plants ranging from one to a hundred.

=== Hybrids ===
Hybrids have been reported between invasive specimens of H. mantegazzianum and native populations of H. sphondylium in Britain; characteristics of such plants tend to be intermediate between the two species. Hybrids only tend to survive where H. sphondylium is the maternal plant.

Other specimens have been recorded which have intermediate morphology, but whose hybrid status is uncertain.

== Phototoxicity of sap ==
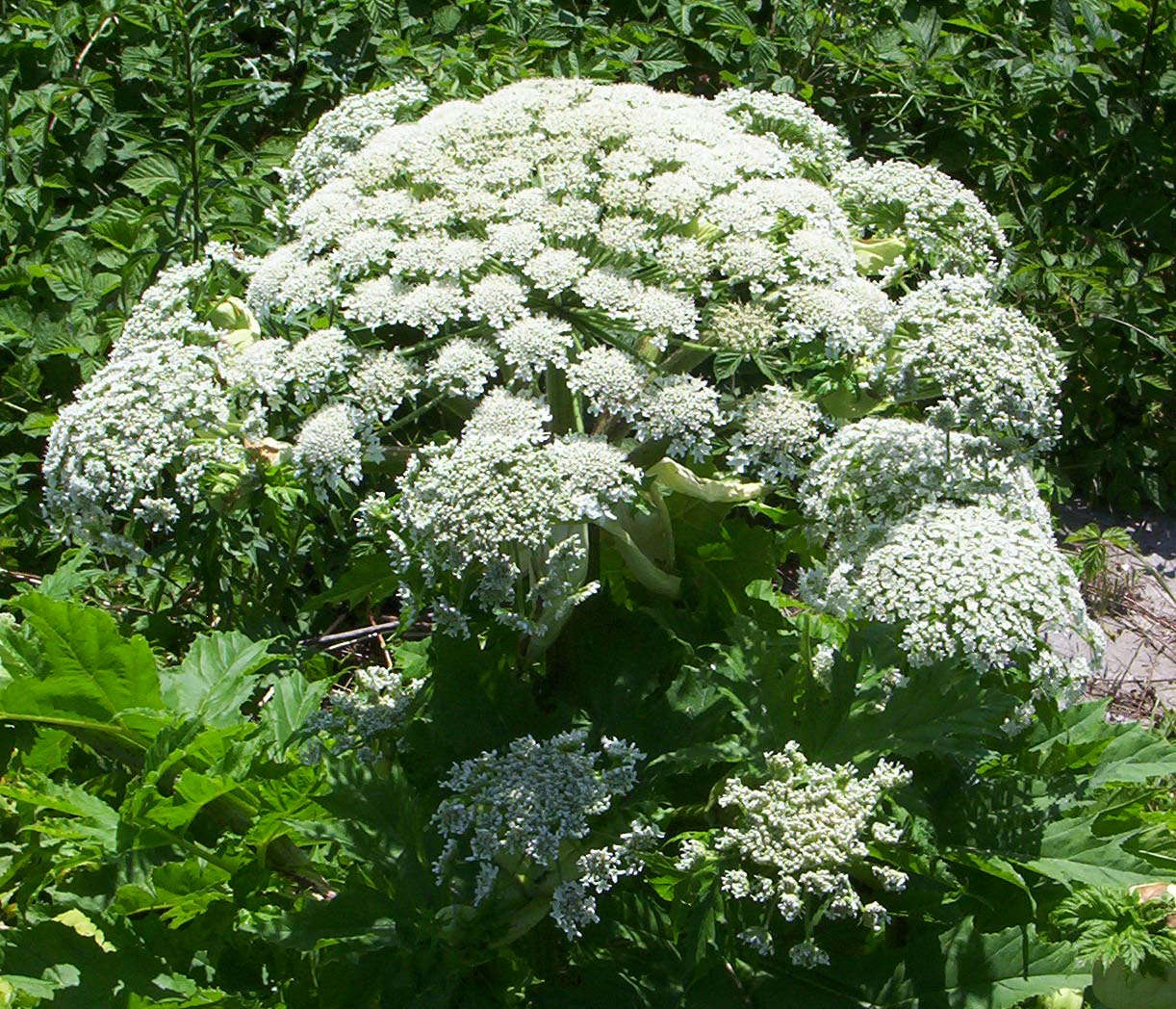
Giant hogweed flower head

The sap of the giant hogweed plant is phototoxic. The sap contains furanocoumarins, which leads to phytophotodermatitis, a serious skin inflammation. A phototoxic reaction can begin as soon as 15 minutes after contact with the sap. Photosensitivity peaks between 30 minutes and two hours after contact but can last for several days. Authorities advise that all humans (especially children) should stay away from giant hogweed. Protective clothing, including eye protection, should be worn when handling the plant. Parts of the body that come into contact with the sap of giant hogweed should be immediately washed with soap and cold water, and further exposure to sunlight should be avoided for at least 48 hours. Other Heracleum species such as H. maximum, are likewise phototoxic, and hence similar caution is advised. Owing to physical similarities to other hogweeds in the genus Heracleum, giant hogweed and its close relatives are sometimes mistaken for harmless plants.

Poisoning via ingestion by humans is not known to occur, discounting phototoxicity from contact with external tissues, and consumption of small amounts of the plant is not deemed to be harmful. However, it should still be avoided due to the obvious extreme hazards created by proximity to the plant. Consumption by other grazing animals does not appear to cause them harm, and sheep have been trialled as a giant hogweed control agent in Scotland. The USDA Forest Service states that pigs and cattle can eat it without apparent harm.

== In popular culture ==
The 1971 album Nursery Cryme by the progressive rock group Genesis contains the song "The Return of the Giant Hogweed". The darkly humorous lyrics describe an attack on the human race by the hogweed, long after the plant was first 'captured' and brought to England by a Victorian explorer.

In her 1985 novel Curse of the Giant Hogweed, popular mystery author Charlotte MacLeod places her established character Peter Shandy and his colleagues in a fantasy version of Wales to investigate giant hogweed endangering Britain's hedgerows.

The plant is featured in season 10, episode 3, of the AMC television series The Walking Dead, growing from zombies which a character encounters, rendering him unable to see properly.

== See also ==
- List of poisonous plants

== Bibliography ==
- Smith, Damian (2018). "Giant Hogweed and related large hogweeds Heracleum mantegazzianum (also applicable to H. persicum and H. sosnowski)". In Fennell, Mark; Jones, Laura; Wade, Max (eds.). Practical Management of Invasive Non-Native Weeds in Britain and Ireland. Liverpool University Press. pp. 34–36. doi:10.2307/j.ctv34h08r7. ISBN 978-1-85341-165-6. JSTOR j.ctv34h08r7.17.
