= Ida P. Mandenova =

Soviet botanist

Ida Mandenova
- Ида Пановна Манденова
- Born: Ida Panovna Mandenova; 1909
- Died: 1995 (aged 85-86)

Academic work
- Discipline: Botany, taxonomy

Ida Panovna Mandenova (Ида Пановна Манденова) (26 July 1907 - 4 September 1995) was a Soviet/Georgian botanist and taxonomist noted for studying and describing Heracleum. She described at least 90 plants. The standard author abbreviation Manden. is used to indicate this person as the author when citing a botanical name.
