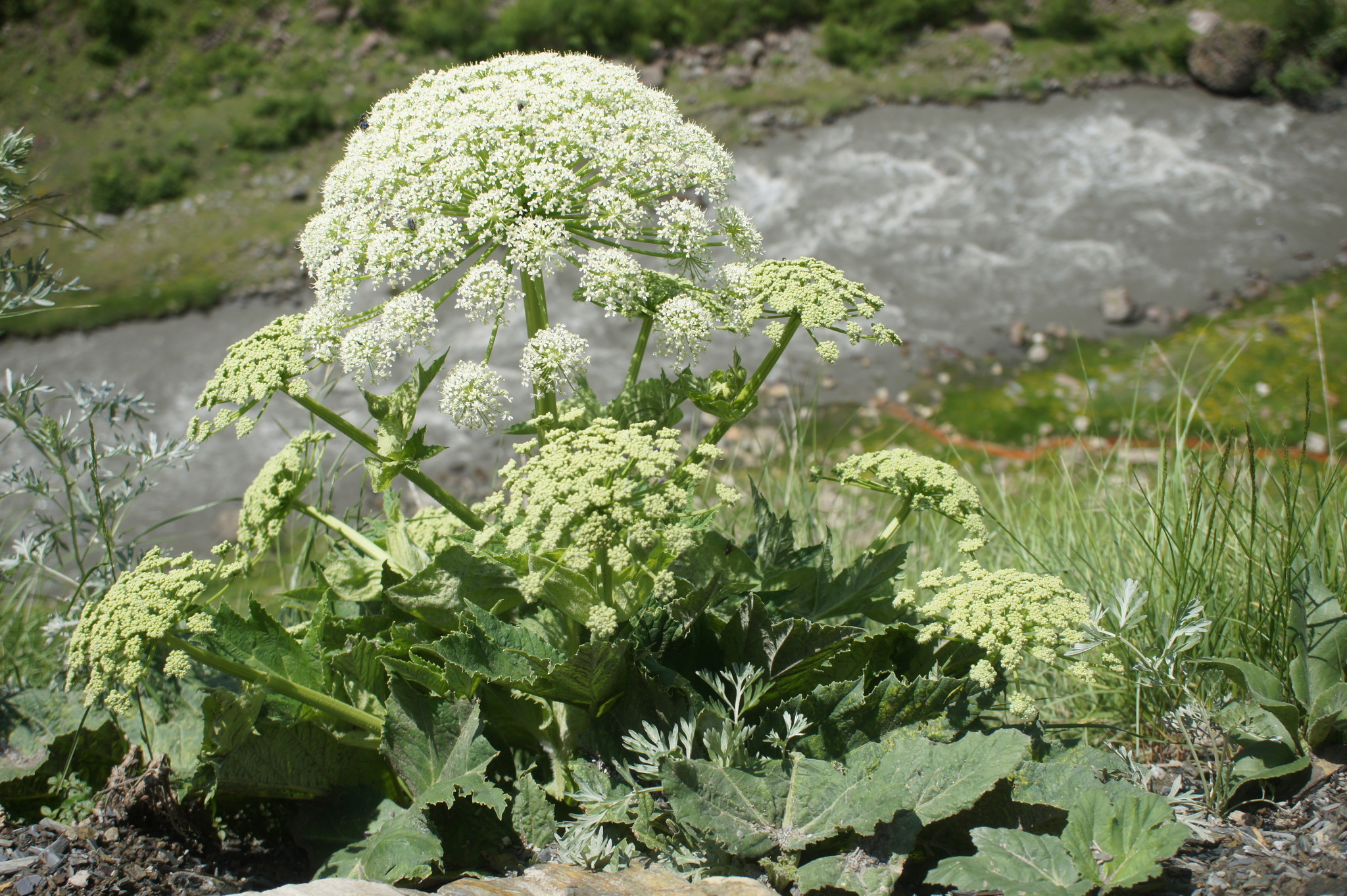
- Heracleum sosnowskyi, Truso Gorge, Georgia

Scientific classification
- Kingdom: Plantae
- Clade: Embryophytes
- Clade: Tracheophytes
- Clade: Spermatophytes
- Clade: Angiosperms
- Clade: Eudicots
- Clade: Asterids
- Order: Apiales
- Family: Apiaceae
- Genus: Heracleum
- Species: H. sosnowskyi

Binomial name
- Heracleum sosnowskyi Manden., 1944
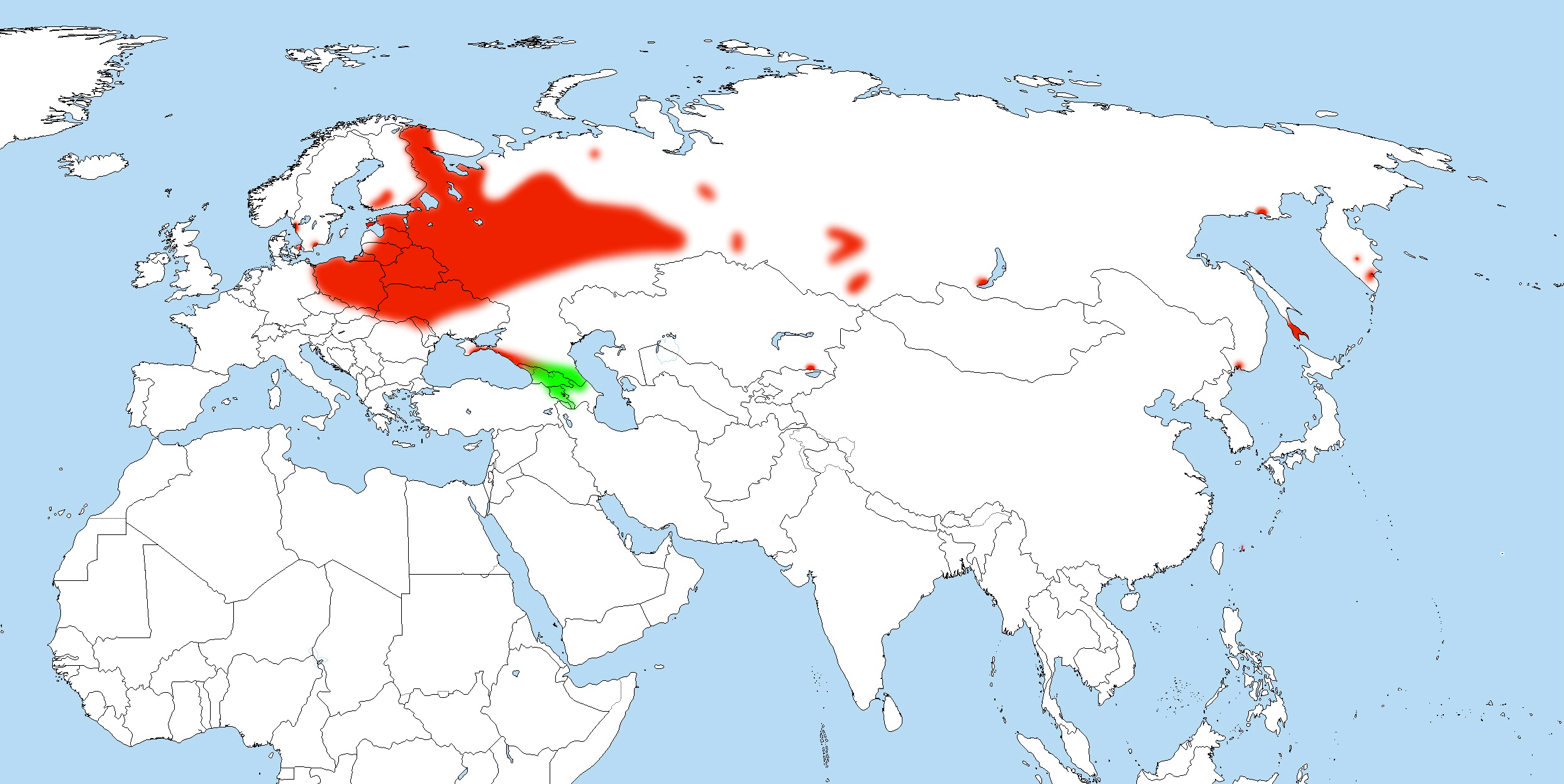
- Green - Native; Red - Introduced

= Heracleum sosnowskyi =

Species of flowering plant

Heracleum sosnowskyi, or Sosnowsky's hogweed, is a monocarpic perennial herbaceous flowering plant in the carrot family, Apiaceae. Its native range includes the central and eastern Caucasus regions and South Caucasus. The native ranges of Heracleum sosnowskyi and H. mantegazzianum, a close relative, overlap. Sosnowsky's hogweed is now a common weed in the Baltic States, Belarus, Poland, Russia, and Ukraine.

== Description ==
Heracleum sosnowskyi is 3–5 metres (10–16 1/2 ft) in height, with a straight, firm stem that can reach a diameter of 12 centimetres (4 1/2 in). The leaves are 50–60 cm (20–24 in) long. The root is very firm, up to 30 cm (12 in) diameter. The inflorescence is a big umbel found at the end of every stem. It blooms from July to September and produces thousands of seeds, which are easily distributed by wind but most commonly by water.

As Sosnowsky's hogweed is a monocarpic perennial species, the entire plant (including the root) dies after flowering and producing seed.

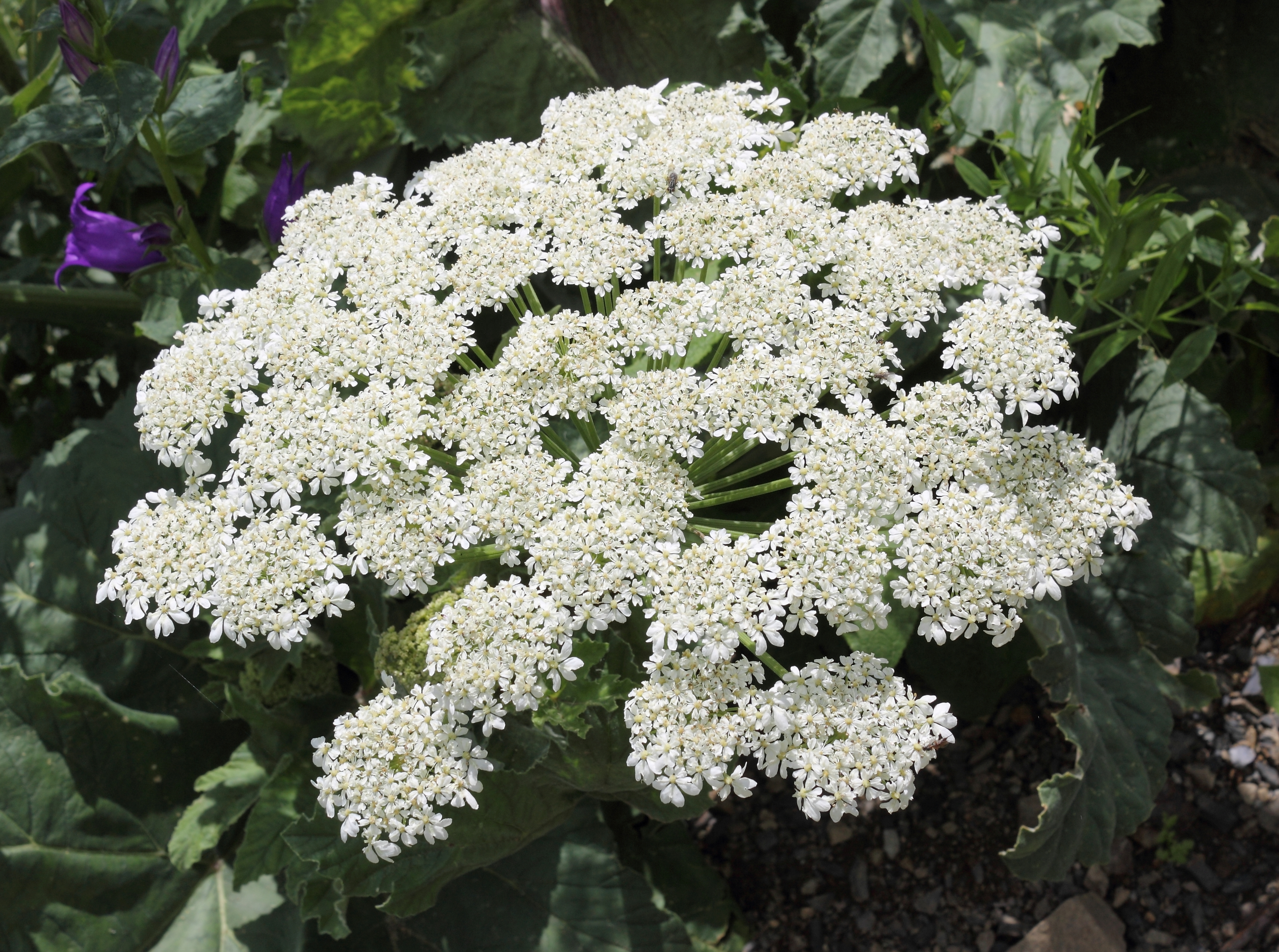
Inflorescences

=== Similar species ===
Similarly tall invasive species include H. mantegazzianum and H. persicum. Similar, though much smaller, non-invasive species include H. sphondylium in Europe and H. maximum in North America.

Additionally, wild parsnip, garden angelica and wild angelica may be similar.

== Taxonomy ==
Early botanists considered H. sosnowskyi to be a subspecies of H. mantegazzianum. Sosnowski's hogweed was described as a separate species by Ida P. Mandenova in 1944. The species is named after the Russian botanist Dmitrii Ivanovich Sosnowsky (1885–1952), who found the species in Georgia in 1936.

== Invasiveness ==
In the European Union, Sosnowsky's hogweed is included since 2016 in the list of invasive alien species of Union concern (the Union list). This implies that this species cannot be imported, cultivated, transported, sold commercially, planted, or intentionally released into the environment in the whole of the EU.

=== Control measures ===
The plant was common only in the Caucasus area until the late 1940s, when Pyotr Vavilov, a Soviet agricultural scientist, persuaded the Lenin All-Union Academy of Agriculture to grow the plant throughout the country for silage in order to restore Soviet agriculture following World War II, arguing that the plant has high nutritional value for agricultural animals and high crop yield. At the time, the plant's invasiveness and toxicity for humans was not considered. The plant started to be cultivated in other parts of the Soviet Union. As a result, it quickly spread in many areas of Russia, Belarus, and Ukraine. It is now a highly invasive plant in the Baltic States, Russia, Poland, and Belarus. Many river valleys and roadsides host large stands of this weed. It is difficult to eradicate because the seeds remain viable for many years and the roots are difficult to remove. Herbicides are widely used in a fight against it, but the plant can later resprout from the roots.

The plant is also used as a shield-hedge along the roads, preventing farm animals from escaping and wild animals from getting in.

The decision to use the plant for silage was made in 1947 under Stalin's rule, so when the species later proved to be highly invasive and difficult to remove, people started to call it "Stalin's revenge".

In February 2024, several lawmakers in the State Duma of Russia introduced a so-called "anti-hogweed bill" that would require property owners to remove the plant from their properties and impose a 50,000 ruble ($540) fine for individuals and 700,000 rubles ($7,550) for legal entities who fail to do so.

== Phototoxicity ==
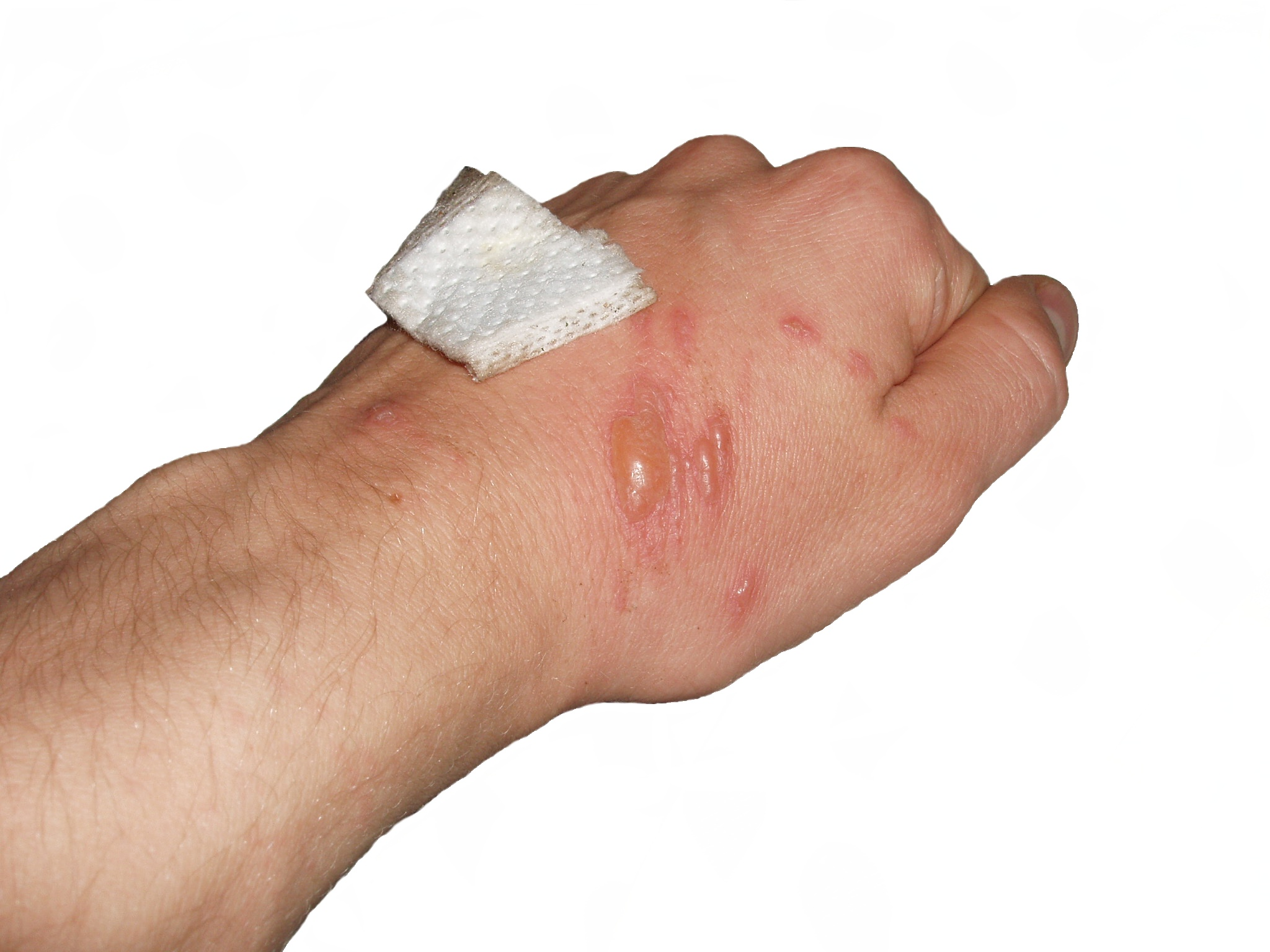
Injured hand due to physical contact with the plant

All parts of H. sosnowskyi contain phototoxic furanocoumarins. It is dangerous for humans because even small drops of the plant's sap can cause skin photosensitivity and burns. The plant is less dangerous for animals that have thick hair to protect them from the sun.
