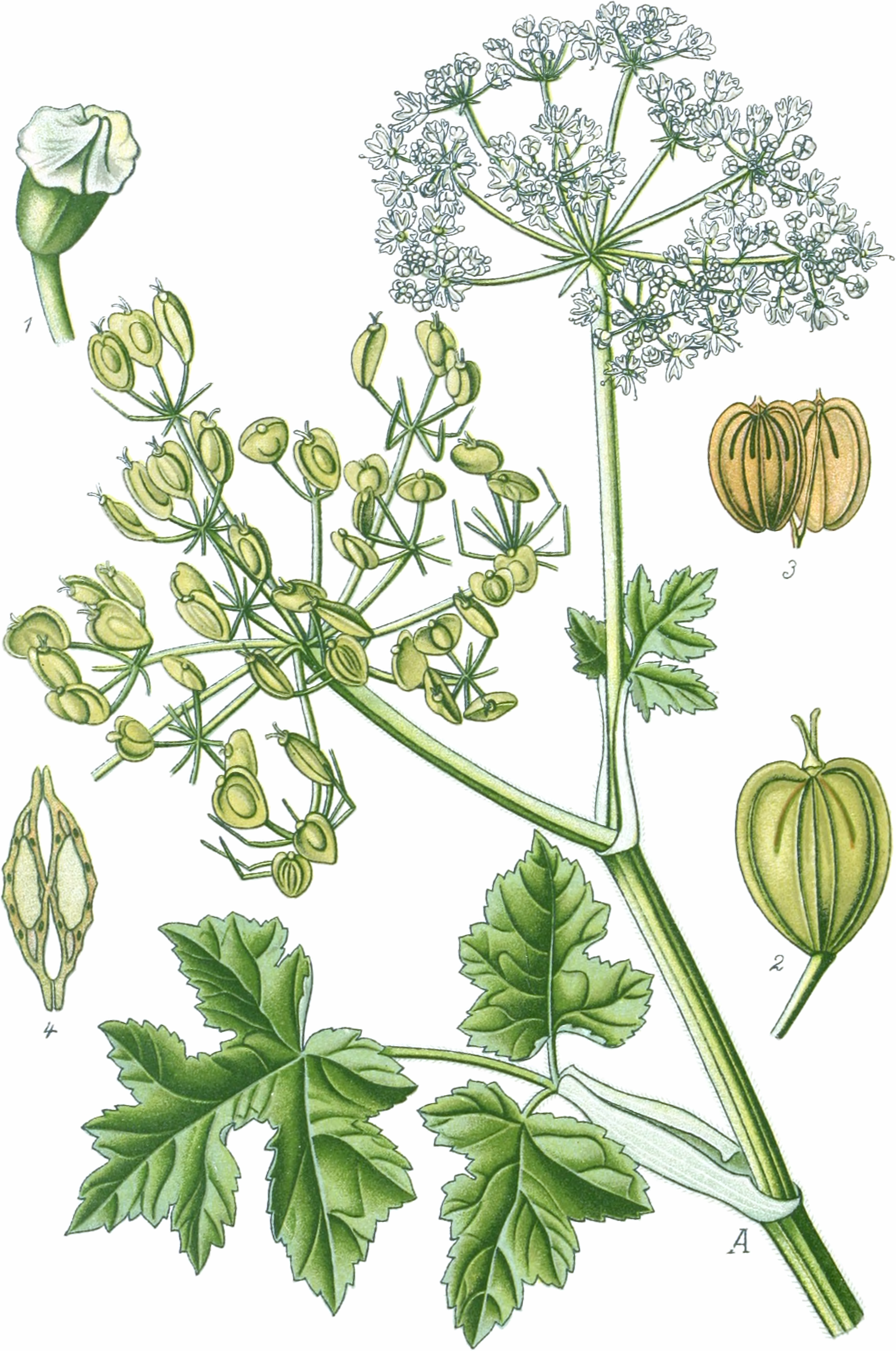
- Heracleum sphondylium
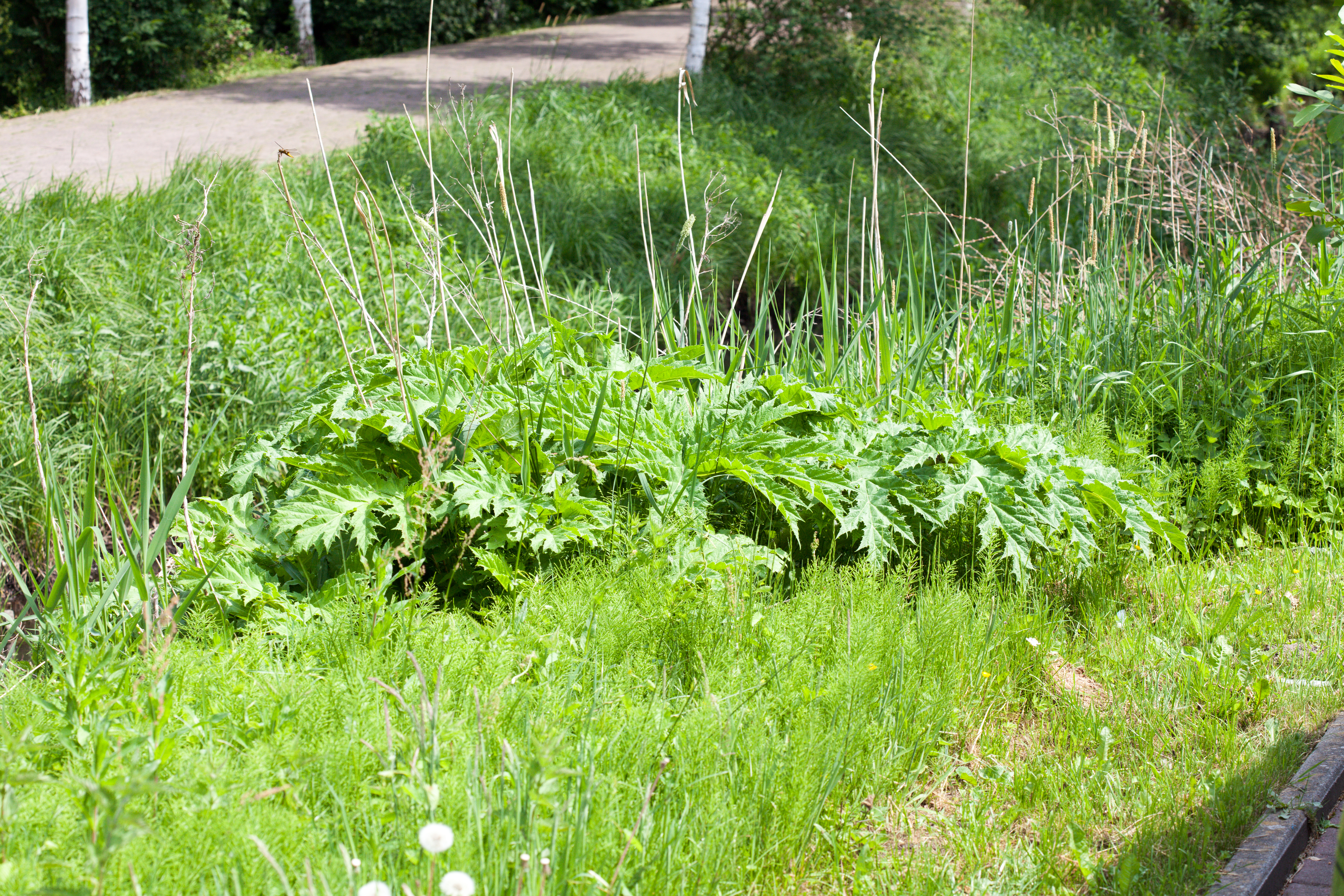
- Heracleum mantegazzianum

Scientific classification
- Kingdom: Plantae
- Clade: Embryophytes
- Clade: Tracheophytes
- Clade: Spermatophytes
- Clade: Angiosperms
- Clade: Eudicots
- Clade: Asterids
- Order: Apiales
- Family: Apiaceae
- Subfamily: Apioideae
- Tribe: Tordylieae
- Subtribe: Tordyliinae
- Genus: Heracleum; L.

Synonyms
- Barysoma Bunge; Sphondylium Adans.; Wendia Hoffm.

= Heracleum (plant) =

Genus of flowering plants in the celery family

Heracleum is a genus of biennial and perennial herbs in the carrot family Apiaceae. They are found throughout the temperate northern hemisphere and in high mountains as far south as Ethiopia. Common names for the genus or its species include hogweed and cow parsnip.

The genus name Heracleum was described by Carl Linnaeus in 1753. It derives from the Ancient Greek Ἡράκλειος (Hērákleios) "of Heracles", referring to the mythological hero.

== Species ==
Many species of the genus Heracleum are similar in appearance. An outlier is H. mantegazzianum, the large size of which is exceptional. Common species include:

- Heracleum mantegazzianum, giant hogweed, native to the western Caucasus region of Eurasia, a serious invasive species in many areas of Europe and North America
- Heracleum sosnowskyi, Sosnowsky's hogweed, native to the eastern Caucasus, a common weed throughout Europe and Asia
- Heracleum persicum, Persian hogweed, native to Iran, Iraq, and Turkey
- Heracleum sphondylium, common hogweed, native to Europe and Asia
- Heracleum maximum, cow parsnip, native and common in North America

As of August 2025, Plants of the World Online accepts the following 91 species:, it had previously in 2019, up to 148.

This part is not finished, you can help by expanding it.

- Heracleum abyssinicum (Boiss.) C.Norman
- Heracleum aconitifolium Woronow
- Heracleum akasimontanum Koidz.
- Heracleum albovii Manden.
- Heracleum amanum Boiss. & Kotschy
- Heracleum angustisectum (Stoj. & Acht.) Peev
- Heracleum anisactis Boiss. & Hohen.
- Heracleum antasiaticum Manden.
- Heracleum apiifolium Boiss.
- Heracleum argaeum Boiss. & Balansa
- Heracleum asperum (Hoffm.) M.Bieb.
- Heracleum austriacum L.
- Heracleum bhutanicum M.F.Watson
- Heracleum biternatum W.W.Sm.
- Heracleum candicans Wall. ex DC.
- Heracleum × carbonnieri Reduron, Michaud & J.Molina
- Heracleum carpaticum Porcius
- Heracleum chorodanum (Hoffm.) DC.
- Heracleum crenatifolium Boiss.
- Heracleum cyclocarpum K.Koch
- Heracleum dalgadianum S.M.Almeida
- Heracleum dissectifolium K.T.Fu
- Heracleum dissectum Ledeb.
- Heracleum egrissicum Gagnidze
- Heracleum elgonense (H.Wolff) Bullock
- Heracleum fargesii H.Boissieu
- Heracleum forrestii H.Wolff
- Heracleum franchetii M.Hiroe
- Heracleum freynianum Sommier & Levier
- Heracleum gorganicum Rech.f.
- Heracleum grandiflorum Steven ex M.Bieb.
- Heracleum hemsleyanum Diels
- Heracleum henryi H.Wolff
- Heracleum humile Sm.
- Heracleum incanum Boiss. & A.Huet
- Heracleum jacquemontii C.B.Clarke
- Heracleum kansuense Diels
- Heracleum kingdonii H.Wolff
- Heracleum lehmannianum Bunge
- Heracleum leskovii Grossh.
- Heracleum ligusticifolium M.Bieb.
- Heracleum likiangense H.Wolff
- Heracleum mantegazzianum Sommier & Levier
- Heracleum maximum W.Bartram
- Heracleum moellendorffii Hance
- Heracleum nyalamense R.H.Shan & T.S.Wang
- Heracleum oncosepalum (Hand.-Mazz.) Pimenov & Kljuykov
- Heracleum oreocharis H.Wolff
- Heracleum orphanidis Boiss.
- Heracleum ossethicum Manden.
- Heracleum paphlagonicum Czeczott
- Heracleum pastinaca Fenzl
- Heracleum pastinacifolium K.Koch
- Heracleum persicum Desf. ex Fisch., C.A.Mey. & Avé-Lall.
- Heracleum peshmeniana Ekim
- Heracleum pinnatum C.B.Clarke
- Heracleum platytaenium Boiss.
- Heracleum ponticum (Lipsky) Schischk. ex Grossh.
- Heracleum pubescens (Hoffm.) M.Bieb.
- Heracleum pumilum Vill.
- Heracleum rapula Franch.
- Heracleum rawianum C.C.Towns.
- Heracleum rechingeri Manden.
- Heracleum × rodnense Nyár. & Todor
- Heracleum roseum Steven
- Heracleum scabridum Franch.
- Heracleum scabrum Albov
- Heracleum schansianum Fedde ex H.Wolff
- Heracleum schelkovnikowii Woronow
- Heracleum sibiricum L.
- Heracleum sommieri Manden.
- Heracleum sosnowskyi Manden.
- Heracleum souliei H.Boissieu
- Heracleum sphondylium L.
- Heracleum stenopteroides Fedde ex H.Wolff
- Heracleum stenopterum Diels
- Heracleum subglabrum Kitam.
- Heracleum subtomentellum C.Y.Wu & M.L.Sheh
- Heracleum sumatranum Buwalda ex Steenis
- Heracleum taylorii C.Norman
- Heracleum tiliifolium H.Wolff
- Heracleum trachyloma Fisch. & C.A.Mey.
- Heracleum vicinum H.Boissieu
- Heracleum villosum (Hoffm.) Fisch. ex Spreng.
- Heracleum wenchuanense F.T.Pu & X.J.He
- Heracleum wilhelmsii Fisch. & C.A.Mey.
- Heracleum wolongense F.T.Pu & X.J.He
- Heracleum woodii M.F.Watson
- Heracleum xiaojinense F.T.Pu & X.J.He
- Heracleum yungningense Hand.-Mazz.

Additionally, a recent species Heracleum kurdicum was discovered, but still not accepted by POWO.

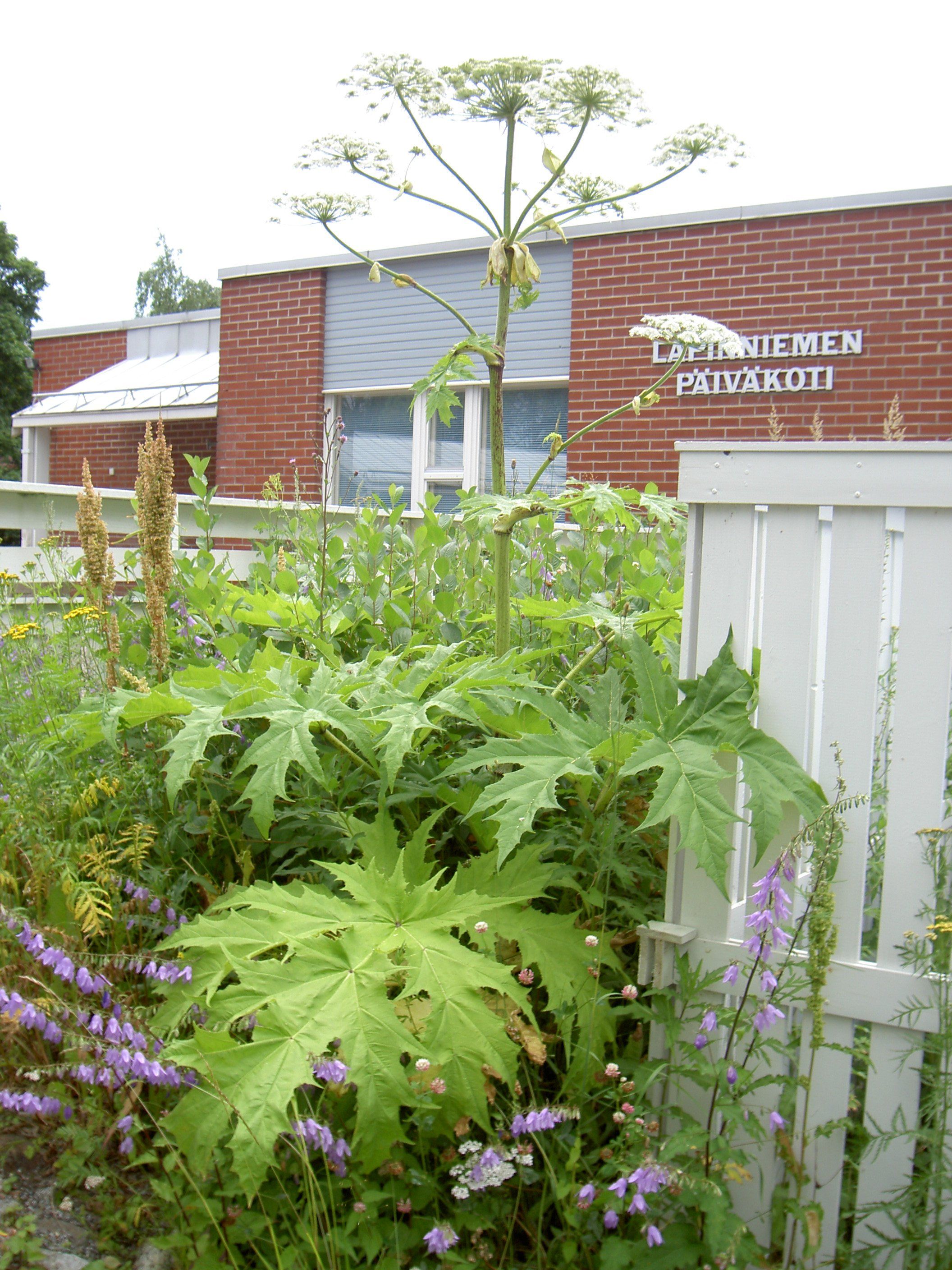
Giant hogweed, Heracleum mantegazzianum

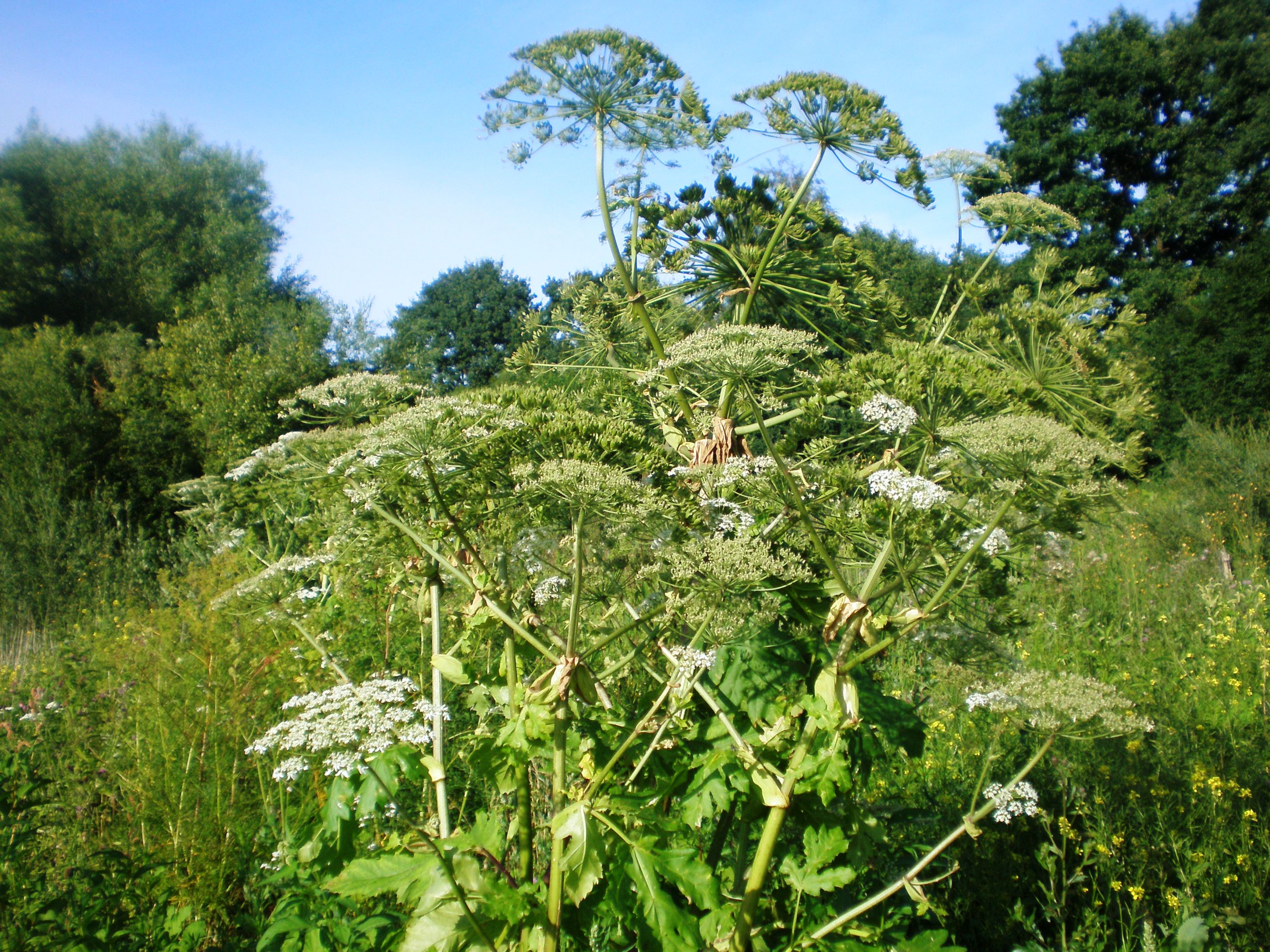
Sosnowsky's hogweed, Heracleum sosnowskyi

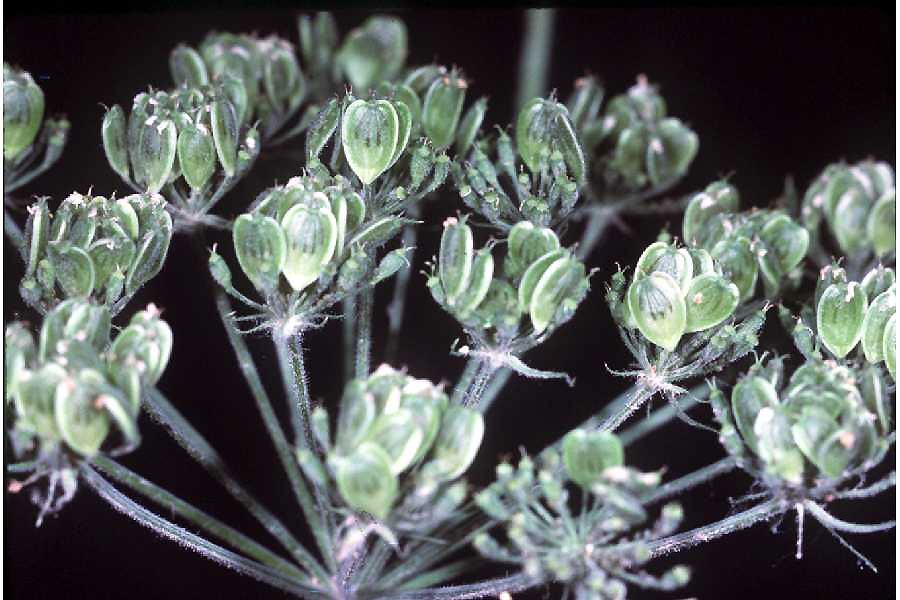
Cow parsnip, Heracleum maximum

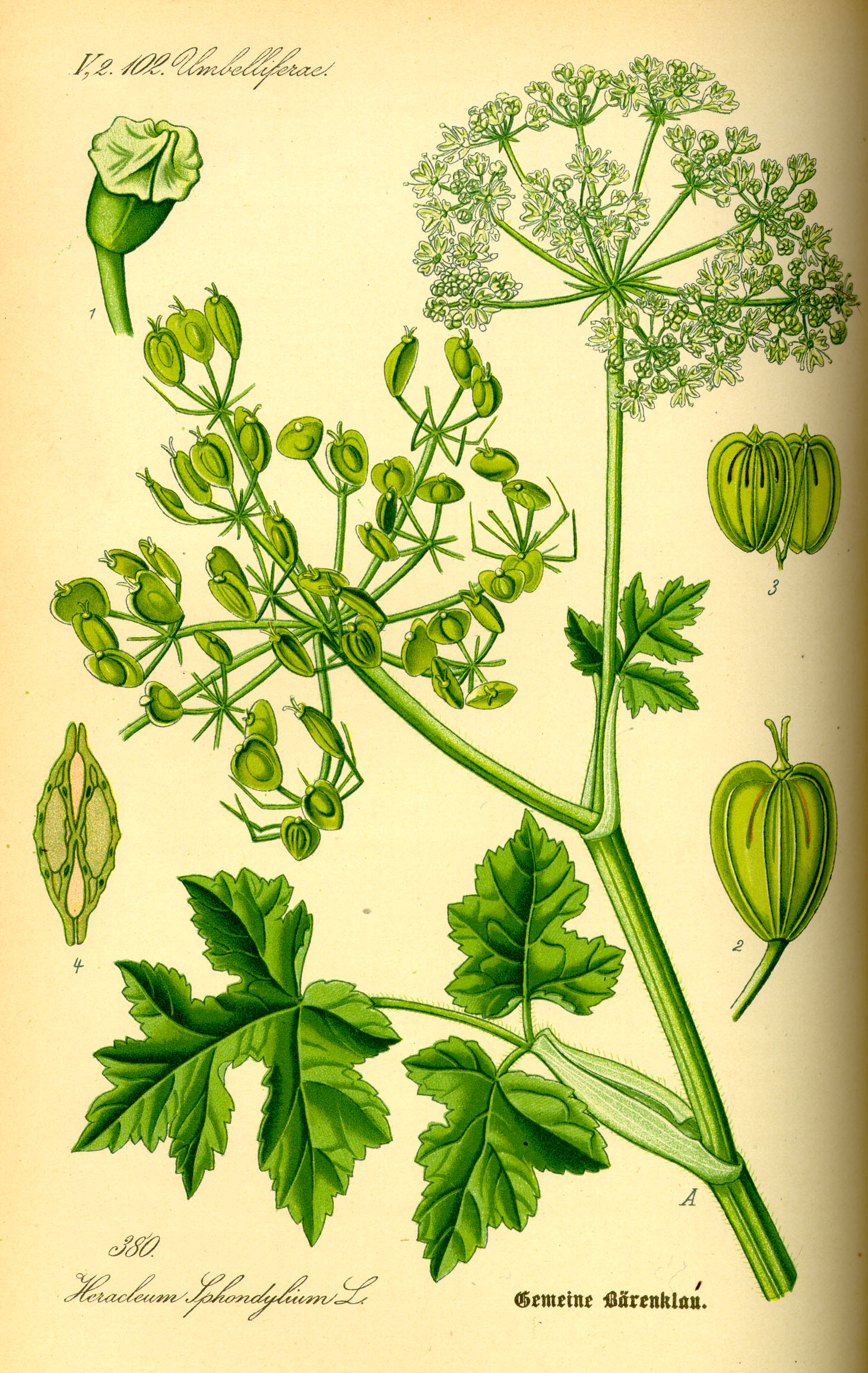
Common hogweed, Heracleum sphondylium

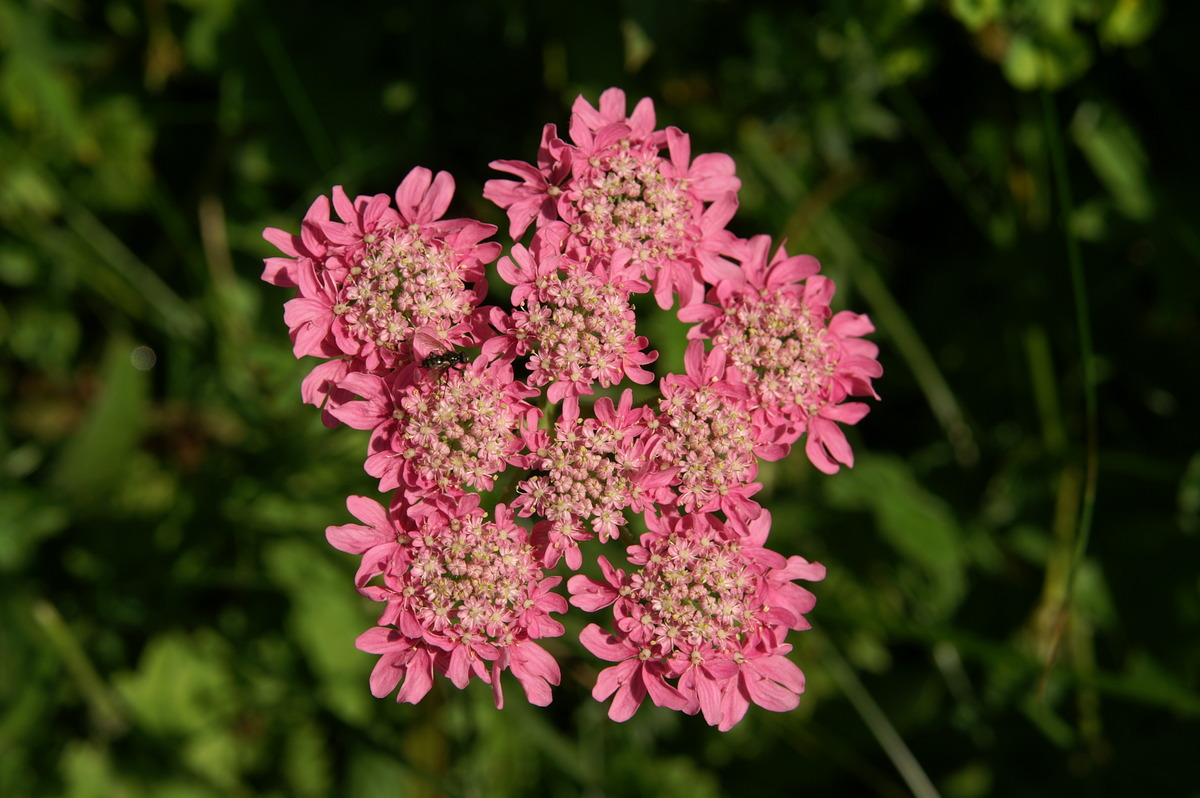
Heracleum austriacum

== Classification and naming ==
Other than size, the related species H. mantegazzianum, H. sosnowskyi, and H. persicum have very similar characteristics. The common name giant hogweed usually refers to H. mantegazzianum alone but in some locales that common name refers to all three species as a group. Both H. maximum and H. sphondylium are often referred to as cow parsnip. To avoid confusion, these species are sometimes referred to as American cow parsnip and European cow parsnip, respectively.

The morphological similarity of species within the genus Heracleum and the difficulty of botanical identification has led to numerous synonyms and naming issues. For example, the classification of the species now widely known as H. maximum has been inconsistent. In the literature, the scientific names H. lanatum, H. maximum, and others are used interchangeably. Prior to 2000, the former name was most popular, but today the latter name is in vogue.

== Phototoxic effects ==
Most species of the genus Heracleum are known to cause phytophotodermatitis. In particular, the public health risks of giant hogweed (H. mantegazzianum) are well known.

At least 36 species of the genus Heracleum have been reported to contain furanocoumarin, a chemical compound that sensitizes human skin to sunlight. Of those, at least 25 species contained a psoralen derivative, either bergapten (5-methoxypsoralen) or methoxsalen (8-methoxypsoralen). Three of those species (H. mantegazzianum, H. sosnowskyi, and H. sphondylium) were found to contain both psoralen derivatives.

== Bibliography ==
- Logacheva, Maria; Valiejo-Roman, C. M.; Pimenov, Michael (February 2007). "ITS phylogeny of West Asian Heracleum species and related taxa of Umbelliferae–Tordylieae W.D.J.Koch, with notes on evolution of their psbA-trnH sequences". Plant Systematics and Evolution. 270 (3): 139–157. doi:10.1007/s00606-007-0619-x.
