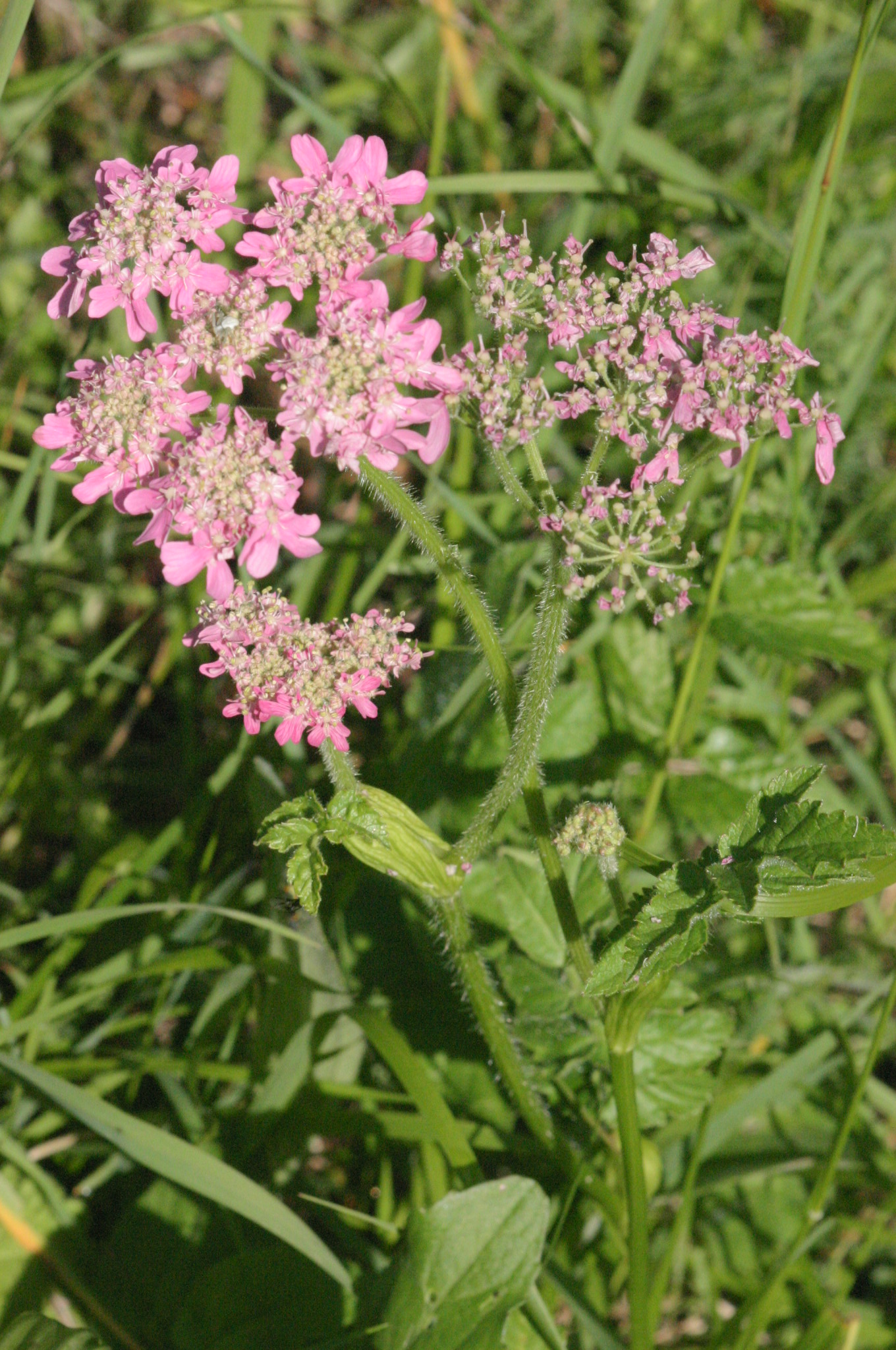
- Heracleum austriacum subsp. siifolium

Scientific classification
- Kingdom: Plantae
- Clade: Tracheophytes
- Clade: Angiosperms
- Clade: Eudicots
- Clade: Asterids
- Order: Apiales
- Family: Apiaceae
- Genus: Heracleum
- Species: H. austriacum

Binomial name
- Heracleum austriacum L.

= Heracleum austriacum =

Species of plant

Heracleum austriacum is a species of plant in the Apiaceae family. It is native to the Alps.

== Description ==
Heracleum austriacum is a perennial plant growing to 0.28 meters and flowering from June to August. It first formally described by the Swedish botanist Carl Linnaeus in the first volume of his Species Plantarum in 1753.

== Subspecies ==
Heracleum austriacum has 2 accepted subspecies:

- Heracleum austriacum subsp. austriacum
- Heracleum austriacum subsp. siifolium
