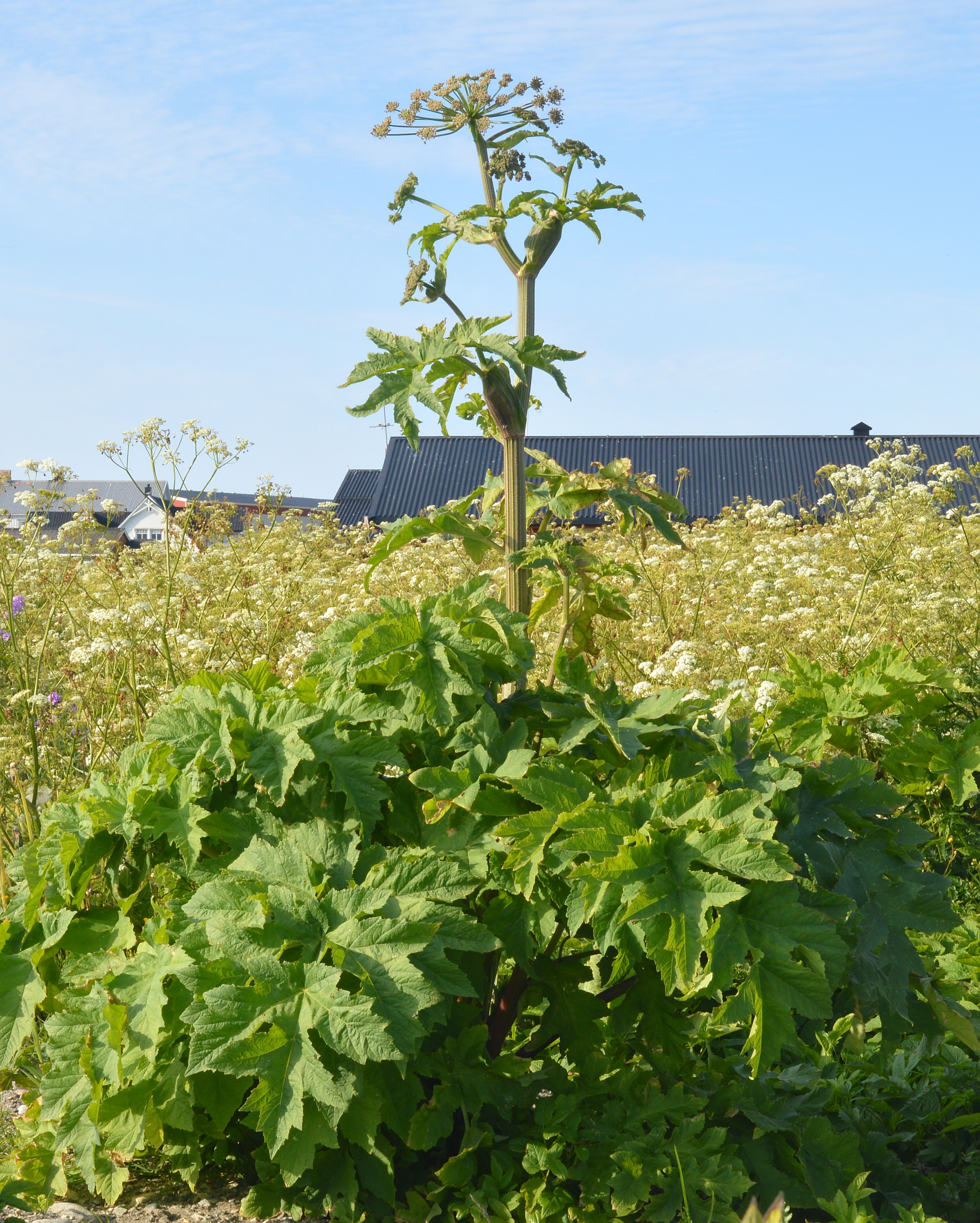
- In Andøy, Norway

Scientific classification
- Kingdom: Plantae
- Clade: Tracheophytes
- Clade: Angiosperms
- Clade: Eudicots
- Clade: Asterids
- Order: Apiales
- Family: Apiaceae
- Genus: Heracleum
- Species: H. persicum

Binomial name
- Heracleum persicum Desf. ex Fisch.

= Heracleum persicum =

Species of flowering plant

Heracleum persicum, commonly known as Persian hogweed or by its native name golpar (Persian: گلپر), is a species of hogweed, a perennial herbaceous plant in the carrot family Apiaceae. It grows wild in humid mountainous regions in Iran and some adjacent areas. Having been introduced in the 1830s, it has spread across Scandinavia. It is now very common in northern Norway, where one of its names is Tromsø palm (after the city of Tromsø). The plant has also been spotted in Sweden. In Finland, it has been declared an invasive species.

Persian hogweed is a polycarpic perennial, that is, a mature plant flowers and bears fruit season after season.

== Invasiveness status ==
In Europe, Persian hogweed is included since 2016 in the list of invasive alien species of Union concern (the Union list). This implies that this species cannot be imported, cultivated, transported, commercialized, planted, or intentionally released into the environment in the whole of the European Union.

== Uses ==
=== Food uses ===
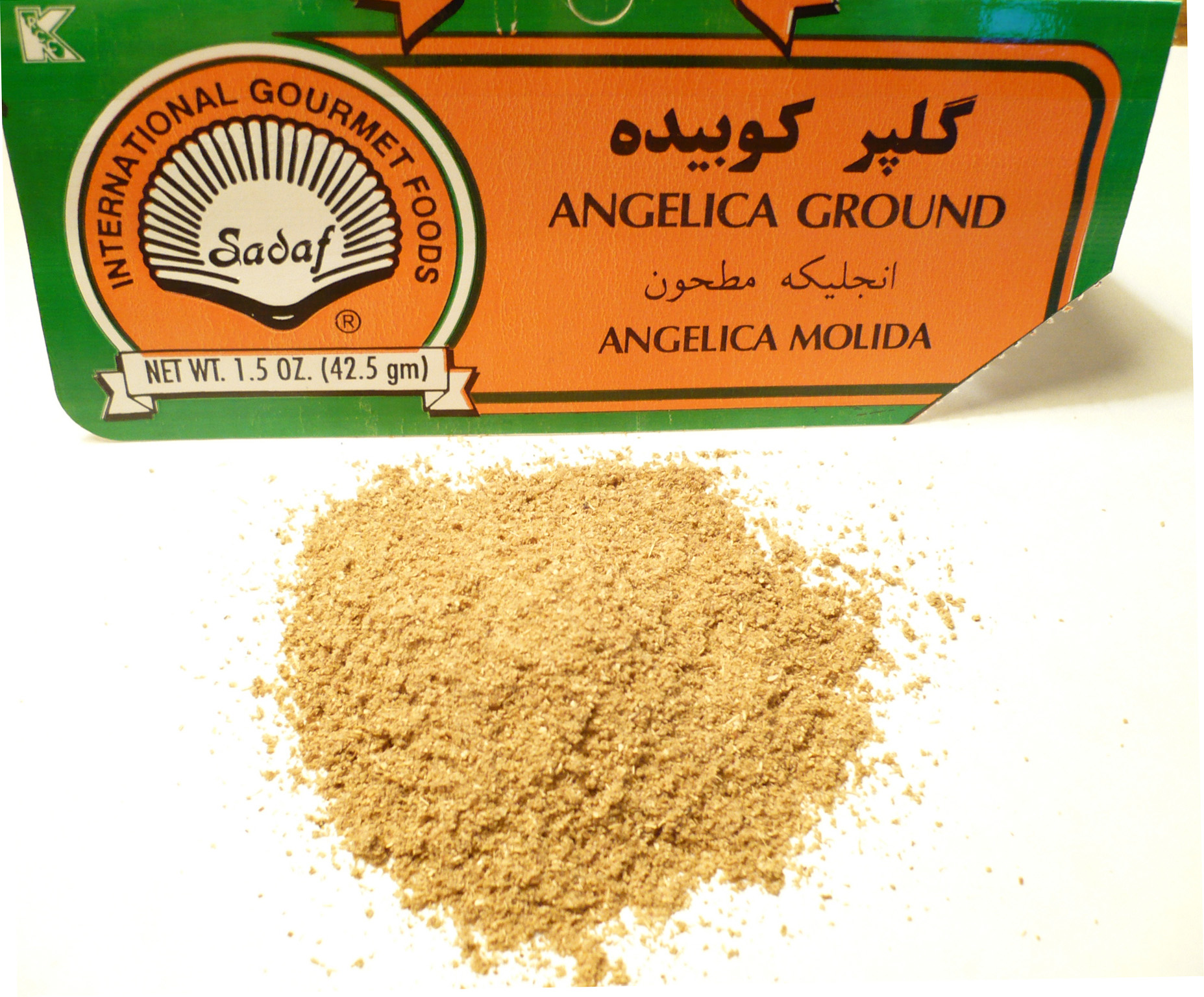
Ground golpar (H. persicum) seeds

The seeds are used as a spice in Persian cooking where they are called golpar. The very thin, small mericarps (seed-like fruits) are aromatic and slightly bitter. They are usually sold in powdered form and are often erroneously sold as "angelica seeds". The powder is sprinkled over broad beans, lentils and other legumes, and potatoes.

Golpar is also used in soups and stews, or sprinkled over pomegranate arils. Golpar is also mixed with vinegar into which broad beans are dipped before eating.

Golpar can be used in small amounts (1 or 2 tsp per pound) when cooking beans and is alleged to reduce the effect of gas in the digestive tract associated with consuming beans.

In Persian cuisine, the petals are used in the spice mixture advieh to flavor rice dishes, as well as in chicken, fish, and bean dishes.

The tender leaves and leaf stalks can also be pickled (known as golpar torshi).

== Chemical composition ==
The chemicals composition in golpar (Persian hogweed) are: hexyl acetate, acetyl acetate, methyl butyrate, ethyl butyrate, and various other acids that are responsible for its pungent smell. Also, there is a kind of oily and volatile essential oil in the Heracleum persicum plant, which is used to flavor some foods.

== Public health and safety ==
The sap of the Tromsø palm contains furanocoumarins, which in combination with ultraviolet light, leads to phytophotodermatitis. There is some anecdotal evidence that H. persicum may be less dangerous than H. mantegazzianum with respect to phototoxicity.

== Control measures ==
Known ways to fight Tromsø palm are constant cutting of new shoots. When cutting down, protective equipment is recommended, and metal cutting tools should be cleaned after use because the juice is oxidizing.

== See also ==
- Heracleum, the genus
- Other tall invasive Heracleum species: Heracleum mantegazzianum and Heracleum sosnowskyi
- Non-invasive Heracleum species: Heracleum sphondylium and Heracleum maximum
- Species that can be mistaken for Heracleum persicum: wild parsnip, garden angelica, wild angelica
