= Bergamot essential oil =

Cold-pressed essential oil

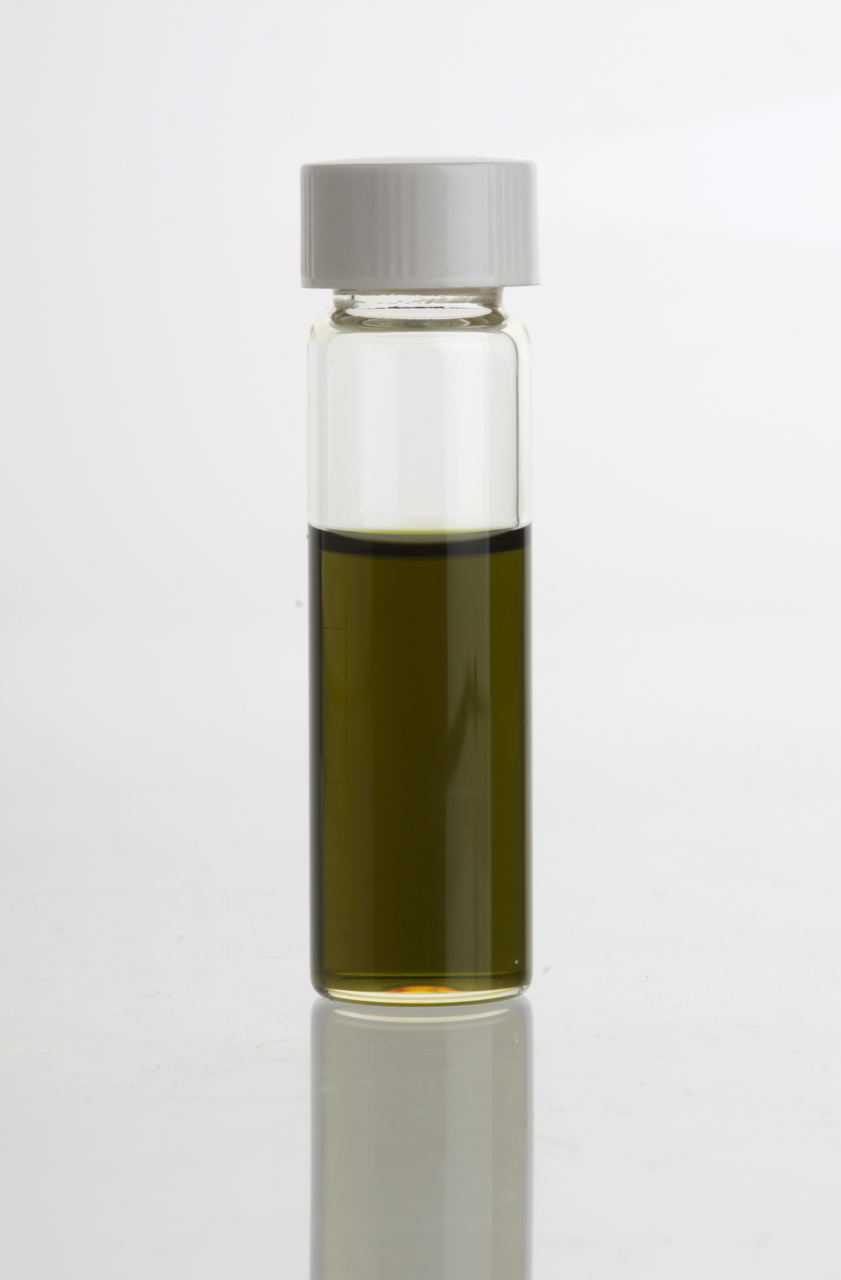
Bergamot essential oil

Bergamot essential oil (pronounced /ˈbɜːrɡəmɒt/), is a cold-pressed essential oil produced by cells inside the rind of a bergamot orange fruit. It is a common flavouring and top note in perfumes. The scent of bergamot essential oil is similar to a sweet light orange peel oil with a floral note.

== Production ==
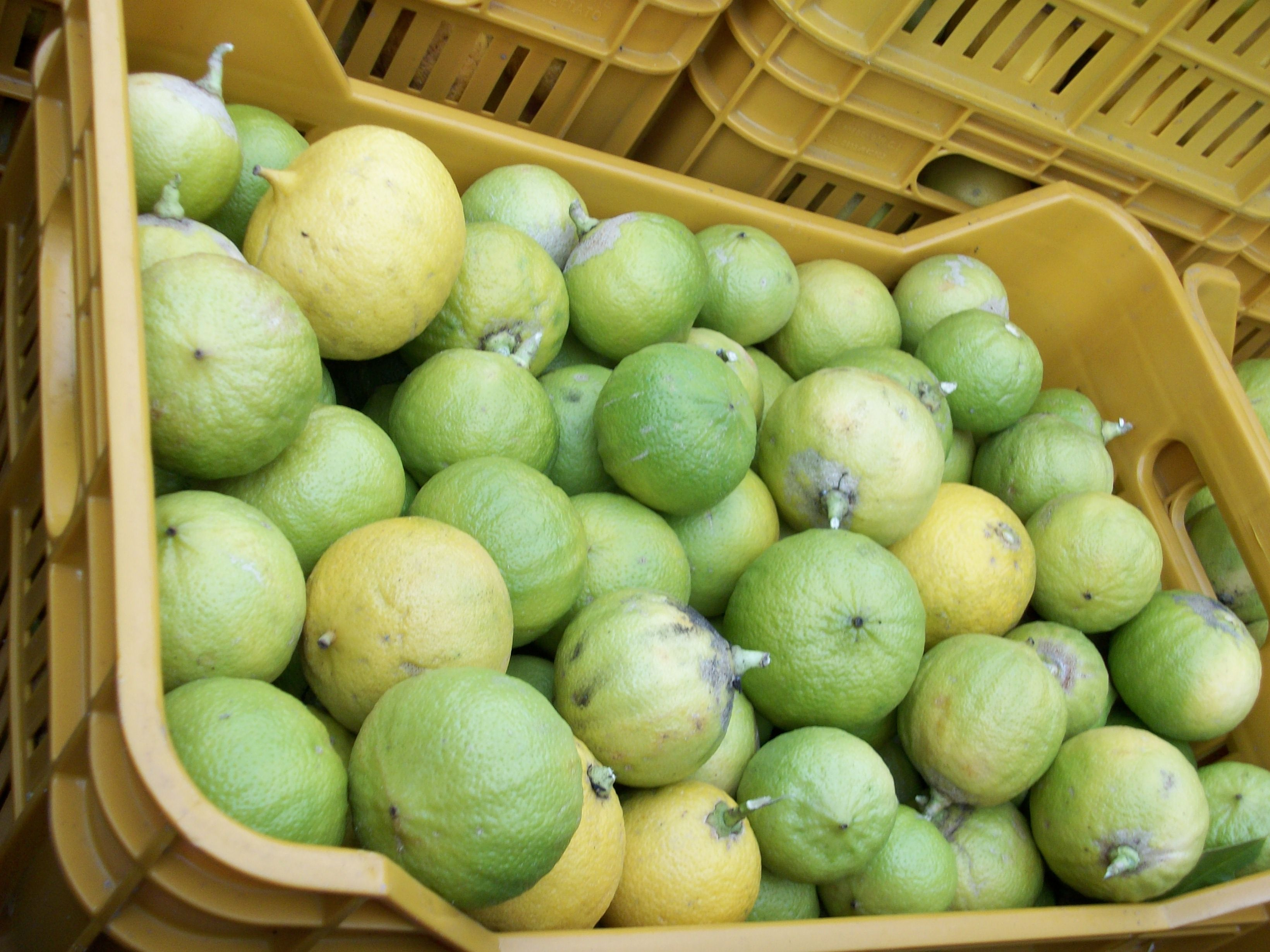
Bergamot fruits harvested for the production of essential oil

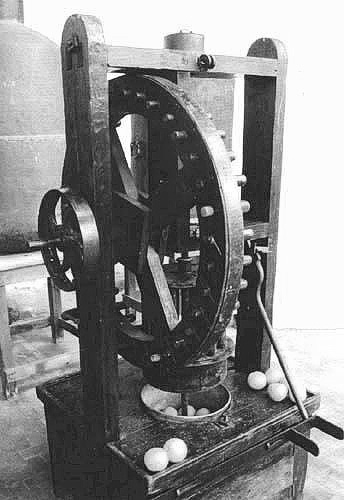
The Macchina calabrese peeler, invented in 1840 by Nicola Barillà

With regard to extracting Bergamot oil from the fruit, the sfumatura or slow-folding process was the traditional technique for manually extracting the bergamot oil.

In the 1840s the macchina calabrese (see image) was invented by Nicola Barillà. A few bergamots of similar size were placed between two metal cups. The lower cup was covered in spikes to hold the fruit still and the upper one was armed with sharp blades. The cups were rotated and the combination of pressure and movement of the upper cup caused oil and water to spray out of the fruit to be collected in a tin-lined copper bowl. The mixture of grated peel and oil would then be strained through woollen sacks.

By more modern methods, the oil is extracted mechanically with machines called peelers, which scrape the outside of the fruit under running water to get an emulsion channeled into centrifuges for separating the essence from the water. The rinds of 100 bergamot oranges yield about 3 ounces (85 g) of bergamot oil.

== Uses ==
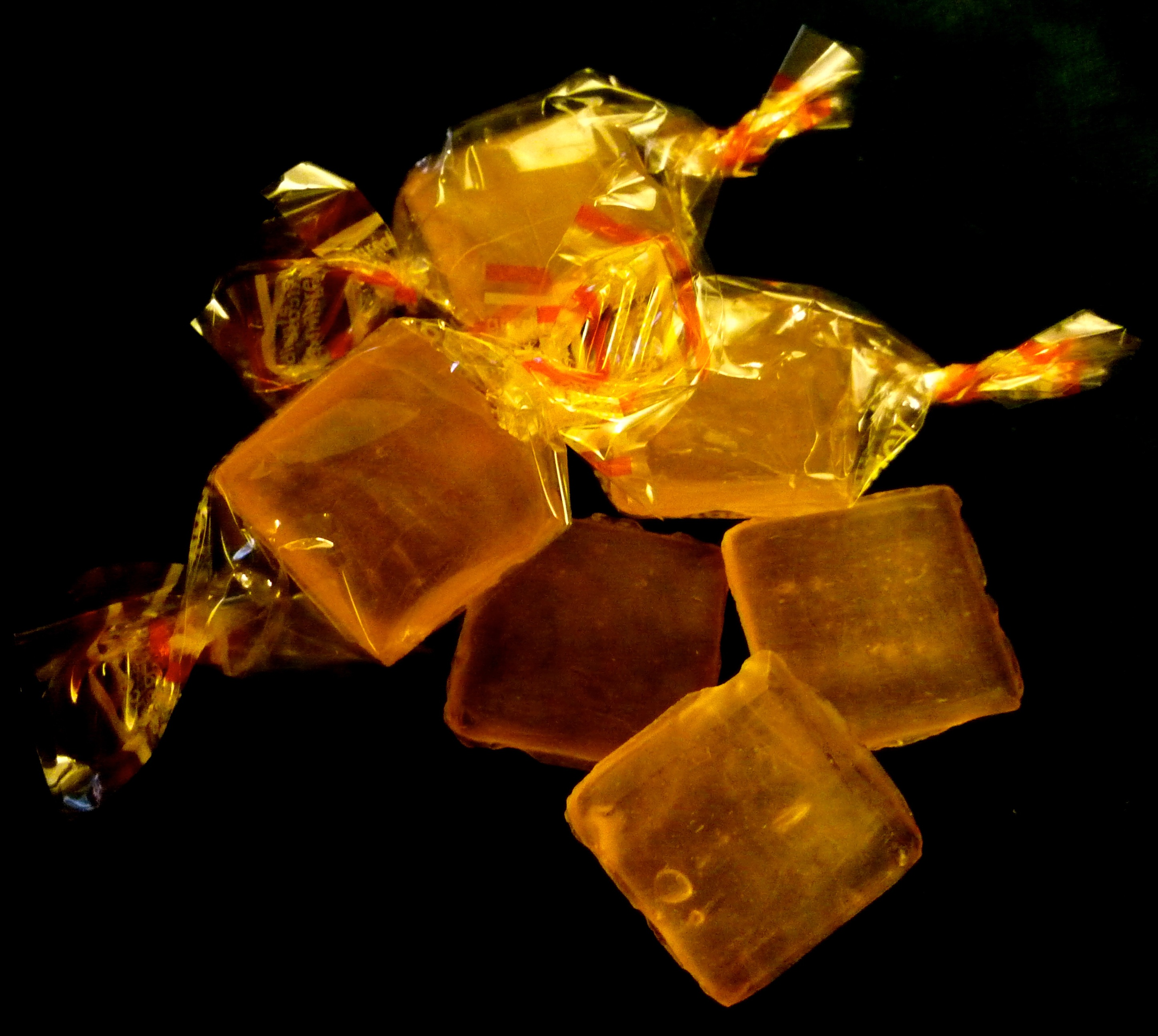
Bergamotes de Nancy

Bergamot essential oil has been used in cosmetics, aromatherapy, and as a flavoring in food and beverages. Its citrus scent makes it a natural flavoring and deodorizing agent. The volatile oils of the bergamot orange are described as flavoring agents in the USP Food Chemicals Codex and are generally recognized as safe for human consumption by the US Food and Drug Administration. For example, Earl Grey tea is a type of black tea that may contain bergamot essential oil as a flavoring agent.

Historically, bergamot essential oil was an ingredient in Eau de Cologne, a perfume originally concocted by Johann Maria Farina at the beginning of the 18th century. The first record of bergamot oil used as a fragrance in perfume is from 1714, found in the Farina Archive in Cologne.

== Constituents ==
A clear liquid (sometimes there is a deposit consisting of waxes) in color from green to greenish yellow, bergamot essential oil consists of a volatile fraction (average 95%) and a non-volatile fraction (5% or residual). Chemically, it is a complex mixture of many classes of organic substances, particularly in the volatile fraction, including terpenes, esters, alcohols and aldehydes, and for the non-volatile fraction, oxygenated heterocyclic compounds as coumarins and furanocoumarins.

=== Volatile fraction ===
The main compounds in the oil are limonene, linalyl acetate, linalool, γ-terpinene and β-pinene, and in smaller quantities geranial and β-bisabolene.

Main volatile components of a Calabrian bergamot essential oil sample
Compound	%
Limonene	37.2%
Linalyl acetate	30.1%
Linalool	8.8%
γ-terpinene	6.8%
β-pinene	2.8%
minor compounds	14.3%
green: terpenes; blue: esters; orange: alcohols; red: minor compounds

=== Non-volatile fraction ===
The main non-volatile compounds are coumarins (citropten, 5-Geranyloxy-7-methoxycoumarin) and furanocoumarins (bergapten, bergamottin).

Main non-volatile components of Bergamot essential oil
Compound	conc. g/L
Bergamottin	21.42
Citropten	2.58
Bergapten	2.37
5-Geranyloxy-7-methoxycoumarin	1.12
orange: coumarins; green: furanocoumarins Concentration in grams per liter of essential oil

== Adulteration ==
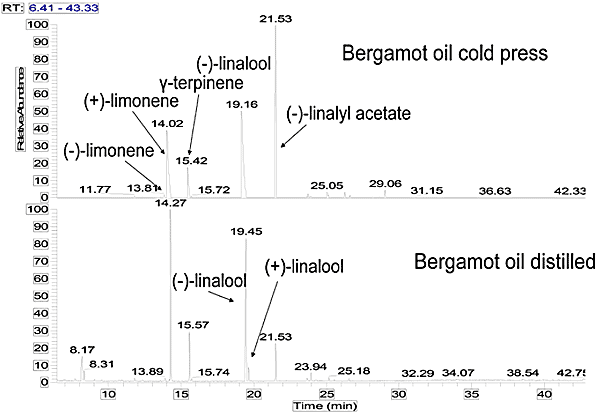
Comparison of bergamot oil obtained from the same raw plant material either by cold pressing or by hydrodistillation (Peratoner) using GC-MS analysis with enantiomeric column

The bergamot essential oil is particularly subject to adulteration being an essential oil produced in relatively small quantities. Generally adulteration is to "cut" the oil, i.e. adding distilled essences of poor quality and low cost, for example of bitter orange and bergamot mint and/or mixtures of terpenes, natural or synthetic, or "reconstruct" the essence from synthetic chemicals, coloring it with chlorophyll. Worldwide, each year, around three thousand tonnes of declared essence of bergamot are marketed, while the genuine essence of bergamot produced annually amounts to no more than one hundred tons.

Natural source analysis based on the Carbon-14 method can identify adulterated essences by detecting synthetic chemicals manufactured from petroleum that are used to mimic the chemical profile of bergamot oil and other essential oils.

Gas chromatography with columns having a chiral stationary phase allows analyzing mixtures of enantiomers. The analysis of the enantiomeric distribution of various compounds, such as linalyl acetate and linalool, allows the characterization of the bergamot oil according to the manufacturing process and allows for the detection of possible adulteration.

The combined use of isotope ratio mass spectrometry and SNIF-NMR (Site-Specific Natural Isotope Fractionation-Nuclear Magnetic Resonance) allows discovering adulteration otherwise undetectable even allowing for the identification of the geographical origin of the essential oil.

The GC-C-IRMS (Gas Chromatography-Combustion – Isotope Ratio Mass Spectrometer) technique, the most recently used, allows obtaining similar results.

=== Reference analytical values ===
Analytical values take as reference for genuinity evaluation of bergamot essential oil by the Experimental Station for the Industry of the Essential oils and Citrus products, in Reggio Calabria, Italy.

Chemical physical characteristics of bergamot essential oil
Chemical physical characteristics	Min	Max	Unit
Refractive index at 20 °C (68 °F)	1.4640	1.4690	adim
Optical rotation at 20 °C (68 °F)	+15.0	+34.0	°
Relative density at 20 °C (68 °F)	0.875	0.883	adim
Esters (expressed as linalyl acetate)	30	45	%
Evaporation residue	4.50	6.50	%
CD (spectrophotometric analysis)	0.75	1.20	adim

Main volatile fraction components of bergamot essential oil
Main volatile fraction components	Min	Max	Unit
Limonene	30	45	%
Linalool	3	15	%
Linalyl acetate	22	36	%
γ-terpinene	6	10	%
β-pinene	4.5	9	%
Δ_{3}-carene	trace	0.008	%
Terpinen-4-ol	trace	0.06	%

Enantiomeric ratios of main chiral components of bergamot essential oil
Enantiomeric ratios of main chiral components	Min	Max	Unit
Limonene ((+)-Limonene / (-)-Limonene)	(97.4 / 2.6)	(98.4 / 1.6)	%
Linalool ((+)-Linalool / (-)-Linalool)	(0.3 / 99.7)	(0.7 / 99.3)	%
Linalyl acetate ((+)-Linalyl acetate / (-)-Linalyl acetate)	(0.3 / 99.7)	(0.6 / 99.4)	%

Non-volatile residue components of bergamot essential oil
Non-volatile residue components	Min	Max	Unit
Bergapten	1800	3800	mg/Kg

== Toxicity ==
The phototoxic effects of bergamot essential oil have been known at least since 1925 when Rosenthal coined the term "Berloque dermatitis" (from the French word "breloque" meaning trinket or charm) to describe the pendant-like streaks of pigmentation observed on the neck, face, and arms of patients. He was unaware that, in 1916, Freund had correctly observed that these pigmentation effects were due to sun exposure after the use of Eau de Cologne, a perfume infused with bergamot oil.

Use of bergamot aromatherapy oil, followed by exposure to ultraviolet light (either sunlight or a tanning bed), has been reported to cause phytophotodermatitis, a serious skin inflammation indicated by painful erythema and bullae on exposed areas of the skin. In one case, six drops of bergamot aromatherapy oil in a bath followed by 20–30 minutes exposure of ultraviolet light from a tanning bed caused a severe burn-like reaction.

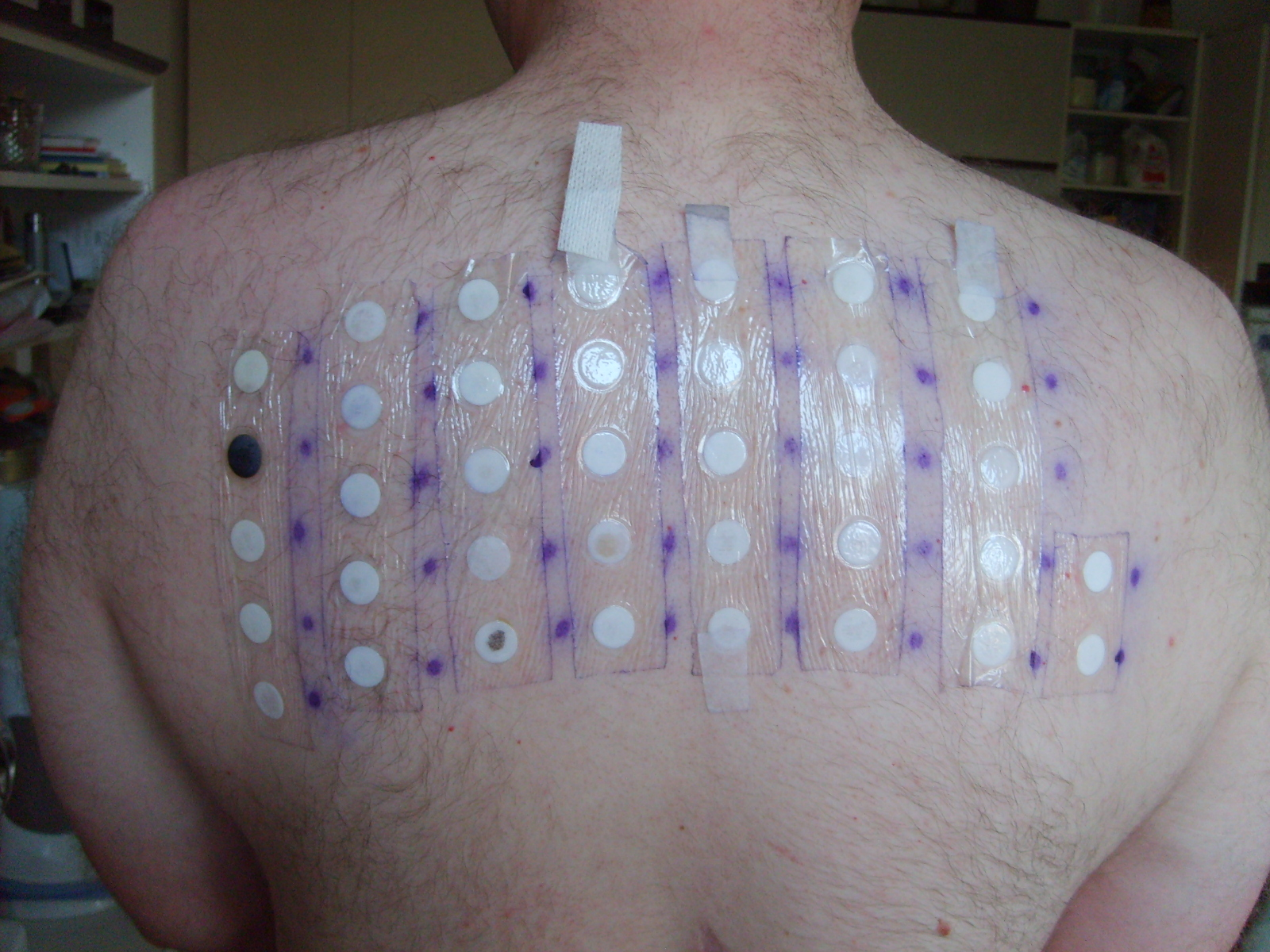
Patch test

Bergamot essential oil contains a significant amount of bergapten, a phototoxic substance that gets its name from the bergamot orange. Bergapten, a linear furanocoumarin derived from psoralen, is often found in plants associated with phytophotodermatitis. Bergamot essential oil has a higher concentration of bergapten (3000–3600 mg/kg) than any other Citrus-based essential oil.

When bergamot essential oil is applied directly to the skin via a patch test, followed by exposure to ultraviolet light, a concentration-dependent phototoxic effect is observed. However, if the oil is twice rectified (and therefore bergapten-free), no phototoxic response is observed.

The International Fragrance Association (IFRA) restricts the use of bergamot essential oil due to its phototoxic effects. Specifically, IFRA recommends that leave-on skin products be limited to 0.4% bergamot oil, which is more restrictive than any other Citrus-based essential oil.

Although generally recognized as safe for human consumption, bergamot essential oil contains a significant amount of bergamottin, one of two furanocoumarins believed to be responsible for a number of grapefruit–drug interactions.

Furanocoumarin contaminants in some berrgamot oil are removed by distillation before the oil is used as a cosmetic.

== Bibliography ==
- Dugo, Giovanni; Bonaccorsi, Ivana (2013). Citrus bergamia: Bergamot and its Derivatives. Medicinal and Aromatic Plants – Industrial Profiles (Book 51). CRC Press. ISBN 978-1439862278.
- Costa, Rosaria; Dugo, Paola; Navarra, Michele; Raymo, Vilfredo; Dugo, Giovanni; Mondello, Luigi (2010). "Study on the chemical composition variability of some processed bergamot (Citrus bergamia) essential oils". Flavour and Fragrance Journal. 25 (1): 4–12. doi:10.1002/ffj.1949. ISSN 0882-5734.
- Mangiola, Carlo; Postorino, Enrico; Gionfriddo, Francesco; Catalfamo, Maurizio; Manganaro, Renato; Calabrò, Giuseppe (October 2009). "Evaluation of the Genuineness of Cold-pressed Bergamot Oil". Perfumer & Flavorist: 26–31.
- Alp Kunkar and Ennio Kunkar, "Bergamotto e le sue essenze", Edizioni A Z
- A. Kunkar, C. Kunkar: Supercritical CO2 extraction of bergamot oil from peel; Int. Cong. Medicinal plants and essential oils- Anadolu üniversıtesi-Eskişehir Turkey
