= Grapefruit–drug interactions =

Drug interactions with grapefruit juice

Infographic from the United States Food and Drug Administration on grapefruit–drug interactions

Some fruit juices and fruits can interact with numerous drugs, in many cases causing adverse effects. The effect is most studied with grapefruit and grapefruit juice, but similar effects have been observed with certain other citrus fruits.

One whole grapefruit, or a small glass (200 mL, 6.8 US fl oz) of grapefruit juice, can cause drug overdose toxicity in patients taking felodipine. Fruit consumed three days before the medicine can still have an effect. The relative risks of different types of citrus fruit have not been systematically studied. Affected drugs typically have an auxiliary label saying "Do not take with grapefruit" on the container, and the interaction is elaborated upon in the package insert. People are advised to ask their physician or pharmacist about drug interactions. However, some experts believe that for the majority of patients, complete avoidance of grapefruit is unwarranted.

Although a prospective cohort study of middle-aged women indicated that some flavonoid-rich foods are associated with a reduction in all-cause mortality, frequent grapefruit consumption was associated with a small increase in all-cause mortality, possibly because of the clinically significant drug interactions of the non-flavonoid components.

== History ==
The effect of grapefruit juice on drug absorption was discovered in 1989 by a group led by pharmacologist David Bailey. Their first published clinical report on grapefruit vs. drug interactions was in 1991. The effect was discovered accidentally in 1989, when a test of drug interactions with alcohol used grapefruit juice to hide the taste of the ethanol. A 2005 medical review advised patients to avoid all citrus juices until further research clarified the risks. It was reported in 2008 that similar effects had been observed with apple juice.

== Polyphenols ==
Citrus fruits contain polyphenols, which may include furanocoumarins and naringin, such as bergamottin, dihydroxybergamottin, and bergapten. Grapefruit, Seville oranges, and bergamot contain naringin. Furanocoumarins may have a stronger effect than naringin.

== Mechanism ==
The effects are caused by furanocoumarins (and, to a lesser extent, flavonoids) which are compounds produced by many plants including but not limited to grapefruit. These chemicals inhibit key drug metabolizing enzymes, such as cytochrome P450 3A4 (CYP3A4). CYP3A4 is a metabolizing enzyme for almost 50% of drugs, and is found in the liver and small intestinal epithelial cells. Organic derivatives of furanocoumarin interfere with liver and intestinal enzyme CYP3A4 and may be responsible for the effects of grapefruit on the enzyme. Cytochrome isoforms affected by grapefruit components include CYP1A2, CYP2C9, and CYP2D6, but CYP3A4 is the major CYP enzyme in the intestine.

Inhibition of enzymes can have two different effects:

1. Grapefruit-juice–mediated inhibition of an enzyme that metabolizes the drug to an inactive metabolite leads to excessive levels of the drug in the body.
2. Grapefruit-juice–mediated inhibition either of a membrane transport protein that helps move substances from the intestine to the blood or of an enzyme that converts a prodrug to an active metabolite leads to insufficient levels of the drug in the body resulting in loss of theurapeutic effect.

Grapefruit or grapefruit juice can reduce the absorption of many drugs by inhibiting transport across cell membranes by the transporters P-glycoprotein (a member of the superfamily of ATP-binding cassette (ABC) transporters) and members of the organo anion transporter family. These transporters appear to have a minimal effect on systemic exposure of the drugs they affect, however. Many drugs are affected by consumption of citrus juice. When the metabolizing enzyme is inhibited, less of the drug will be metabolized by it in the epithelial cells. This interaction is particularly dangerous when the drug in question has a low therapeutic index, so that a small increase in blood concentration can be the difference between therapeutic effect and toxicity. Citrus juice inhibits the enzyme only within the intestines if consumed in small amounts. When larger amounts are consumed they may in addition inhibit the enzyme in the liver. The hepatic enzyme inhibition may cause an additional increase in potency and a prolonged metabolic half-life (prolonged metabolic half-life for all ways of drug administration).

== Duration and timing ==
=== Metabolism interactions ===
Grapefruit–drug interactions that affect the pre-systemic metabolism (i.e., the metabolism that occurs before the drug enters the blood) of drugs have a different duration of action than interactions that work by other mechanisms, such as on absorption, discussed below.

The interaction is greatest when the juice is ingested with the drug or up to four hours before the drug.

The location of the inhibition occurs in the lining of the intestines, not within the liver. The effects last because grapefruit-mediated inhibition of drug metabolizing enzymes, like CYP3A4, is irreversible; that is, once the grapefruit has "broken" the enzyme, the intestinal cells must produce more of the enzyme to restore their capacity to metabolize drugs that the enzyme is used to metabolize. It takes around 24 hours to regain 50% of the cell's baseline enzyme activity and it can take 72 hours for the enzyme activity to completely return to baseline. For this reason, simply separating citrus consumption and medications taken daily does not avoid the drug interaction.

=== Absorption interactions ===
For medications that interact due to inhibition of OATP (organic anion-transporting polypeptides), a relative short period of time is needed to avoid this interaction, and a four-hour interval between grapefruit consumption and the medication should suffice. For drugs recently sold on the market, drugs have information pages (monographs) that provide information on any potential interaction between a medication and grapefruit juice. Because there is a growing number of medications that are known to interact with citrus, patients should consult a pharmacist or physician before consuming citrus while taking their medications.

== Affected fruit ==
Grapefruit is not the only citrus fruit that can interact with medications. One medical review advised patients to avoid all citrus.

There are three ways to test if a fruit interacts with drugs:

1. Test a drug–fruit combination in humans
2. Test a fruit chemically for the presence of the interacting polyphenol compounds
3. Test a fruit genetically for the genes needed to make the interacting polyphenol compounds

The first approach involves risk to trial volunteers. The first and second approaches have another problem: the same fruit cultivar could be tested twice with different results. Depending on growing and processing conditions, concentrations of the interacting polyphenol compounds can vary dramatically. The third approach is hampered by a paucity of knowledge of the genes in question.

=== Citrus genetics and interactions ===
Citrus fruits clustered by genetic similarity. Most commercial varieties of citrus are hybrids of the three species at the corners of the ternary diagram, and genetically distinct hybrids often bear the same common name. Furanocoumarin production has been inherited by some hybrid cultivars; others have not inherited the furanocoumarin-producing genes.

A descendant of citrus cultivars that cannot produce the problematic polyphenol compounds would presumably also lack the genes to produce them. Many citrus cultivars are hybrids of a small number of ancestral species, which have now been fully genetically sequenced.

Many traditional citrus groups, such as true sweet oranges and lemons, seem to be bud sports, mutant descendants of a single hybrid ancestor. In theory, cultivars in a bud sport group would be either all safe or all problematic. Nonetheless, new citrus varieties arriving on the market are increasingly likely to be sexually created hybrids, not asexually created sports.

The ancestry of a hybrid cultivar may not be known. Even if it is known, it is not possible to be certain that a cultivar will not interact with drugs on the basis of taxonomy, as it is not known which ancestors lack the capacity to make the problematic polyphenol compounds. Nonetheless, many of the citrus cultivars known to be problematic seem to be closely related.

==== Ancestral species ====
Pomelo (the Asian fruit that was crossed with an orange to produce grapefruit) contains high amounts of furanocoumarin derivatives. Grapefruit relatives and other varieties of pomelo have variable amounts of furanocoumarin.

The Dancy cultivar has a small amount of pomelo ancestry, but is genetically close to a non-hybrid true mandarin (unlike most commercial mandarins, which may have much more extensive hybridization). Eight Dancy fruits, all picked at one time from one tree, have been blended and tested for furanocoumarins; none were detectable.

==== Hybrid cultivars ====
Both sweet oranges and bitter oranges are mandarin-pomelo hybrids. Bitter oranges (such as the Seville oranges often used in marmalade) can interfere with drugs including etoposide, a chemotherapy drug, some beta blocker drugs used to treat high blood pressure, and cyclosporine, taken by transplant patients to prevent rejection of their new organs. Evidence on sweet oranges is more mixed.

Tests on some tangelos (hybrids of mandarins/tangerines and pomelo or grapefruit) have not shown significant amounts of furanocoumarin; these studies were also conducted on eight fruit all picked at one time from one tree.

Common lemons are the product of orange/citron hybridization, and hence have pomelo ancestry, and although Key limes are papeda/citron hybrids, the more commercially prevalent Persian limes and similar varieties are crosses of the Key lime with lemons, and hence likewise have pomelo ancestry. These limes can also inhibit drug metabolism. Other less-common citrus species also referred to as lemons or limes are genetically distinct from the more common varieties, with different proportions of pomelo ancestry.

==== Inaccurate labeling ====
Marketing classifications often do not correspond to taxonomic ones. The "Ambersweet" cultivar is marketed and sold as an orange, but does not descend from the same common ancestor as sweet oranges; it has grapefruit, orange, and mandarin ancestry. Fruits are often sold as mandarin, tangerine, or satsuma (which may be synonyms). Many fruits sold under these names such as Sunbursts and Murcotts are hybrids with grapefruit ancestry.

=== Other fruit and vegetables ===
The discovery that flavonoids are responsible for some interactions make it plausible that other fruit and vegetables are affected.

==== Apple juice ====
Apple juice, especially commercially produced products, interferes with the action of OATPs. This interference can decrease the absorption of a variety of commonly used medications, including beta blockers like atenolol, antibiotics like ciprofloxacin, and antihistamines like fexofenadine.

==== Pomegranate juice ====
Pomegranate juice inhibits the action of the drug metabolizing enzymes CYP2C9 and CYP3A4. As of 2014, the currently available literature does not appear to indicate a clinically relevant impact of pomegranate juice on drugs that are metabolized by CYP2C9 and CYP3A4.

== Affected drugs ==
Researchers have identified over 85 drugs with which grapefruit reacts adversely. According to a review done by the Canadian Medical Association, there is an increase in the number of potential drugs that can interact with grapefruit juice, and of the number of fruit types that can interact with those drugs. From 2008 to 2012, the number of drugs known to potentially interact with grapefruit, with risk of harmful or even dangerous effects (gastrointestinal bleeding, nephrotoxicity), increased from 17 to 43.

=== Traits ===
The interaction between citrus and medication depends on the individual drug, and not the class of the drug. Drugs that interact usually share three common features: they are taken orally, normally only a small amount enters systemic blood circulation, and they are metabolized by CYP3A4. The effects on the CYP3A4 in the liver could, in principle, cause interactions with non-CYP3A4-mediated effects.

Cytochrome isoforms affected by grapefruit components include CYP3A4, CYP1A2, CYP2C9, and CYP2D6. Drugs that are metabolized by these enzymes may have interactions with components of grapefruit.

An easy way to tell if a medication may be affected by grapefruit juice is by researching whether another known CYP3A4 inhibitor drug is already contraindicated with the active drug of the medication in question. Examples of such known CYP3A4 inhibitors include cisapride (Propulsid), erythromycin, itraconazole (Sporanox), ketoconazole (Nizoral), and mibefradil (Posicor).

=== Incomplete list of affected drugs ===
==== By enzyme ====
Drugs that interact with grapefruit compounds at CYP3A4 include:

- benzodiazepines: triazolam (Halcion), orally administered midazolam (Versed), orally administered nitrazepam (Mogodon), diazepam (Valium), clonazepam (Klonopin), alprazolam (Xanax) and quazepam (Doral, Dormalin)
- ritonavir (Norvir): Inhibition of CYP3A4 prevents the metabolism of protease inhibitors such as ritonavir.
- sertraline (Zoloft and Lustral)
- verapamil (Covera-HS, Calan, Verelan, and Isoptin)
- gilteritinib (Xospata)

Drugs that interact with grapefruit compounds at CYP1A2 include:

- caffeine

Drugs that interact with grapefruit compounds at CYP2D6 include:

- dextroamphetamine (Dexedrine)
- dextroamphetamine (75%)/ levoamphetamine (25%) (Adderall)
- dextromethamphetamine (Desoxyn)

Research has been done on the interaction between amphetamines and CYP2D6 enzyme, and researchers concluded that some parts of substrate molecules contribute to the binding of the enzyme.

==== Other interactions ====
Additional drugs affected by grapefruit juice include, but are not limited to:

- Some statins, including atorvastatin (Lipitor), lovastatin (Mevacor), and simvastatin (Zocor, Simlup, Simcor, Simvacor)
  - In contrast, pravastatin (Pravachol), fluvastatin (Lescol), and rosuvastatin (Crestor) are unaffected by grapefruit.
- Anti-arrhythmics including amiodarone (Cordarone), dronedarone (Multaq), quinidine (Quinidex, Cardioquin, Quinora), disopyramide (Norpace), propafenone (Rythmol) and carvedilol (Coreg)
- Amlodipine: Grapefruit increases the available amount of the drug in the blood stream, leading to an unpredictable increase in antihypertensive effects.
- Anti-migraine drugs ergotamine (Cafergot, Ergomar), amitriptyline (Elavil, Endep, Vanatrip) and nimodipine (Nimotop)
- Erectile dysfunction drugs sildenafil (Viagra), tadalafil (Cialis) and vardenafil (Levitra)
- Acetaminophen (also known as paracetamol, brand name Tylenol) concentrations increase in the blood of mice when they consume white and pink grapefruit juice, with the white juice acting faster. "The bioavailability of paracetamol was significantly reduced following multiple GFJ administration" in mice and rats. This suggests that repeated intake of grapefruit juice reduces the efficacy and bioavailability of acetaminophen/paracetamol in comparison with a single dose of grapefruit juice, which conversely increases the efficacy and bioavailability of acetaminophen/paracetamol.
- Anthelmintics: Used for treating certain parasitic infections; includes praziquantel
- Buprenorphine: Metabolized into norbuprenorphine by CYP3A4
- Buspirone (Buspar): Grapefruit juice increased peak and AUC plasma concentrations of buspirone 4.3- and 9.2-fold, respectively, in a randomized, 2-phase, ten-subject crossover study.
- Codeine is a prodrug that produces its analgesic properties following metabolism to morphine entirely by CYP2D6.
- Ciclosporin (cyclosporine, Neoral): Blood levels of ciclosporin are increased if taken with grapefruit juice, orange juice, or apple juice. A plausible mechanism involves the combined inhibition of enteric CYP3A4 and MDR1, which potentially leads to serious adverse events (e.g., nephrotoxicity). Blood levels of tacrolimus (Prograf) can also be equally affected for the same reason as ciclosporin, as both drugs are calcineurin inhibitors.
- Dihydropyridines including felodipine (Plendil), nicardipine (Cardene), nifedipine, nisoldipine (Sular) and nitrendipine (Bayotensin)
- Erlotinib (Tarceva)
- Exemestane, aromasin, and by extension all estrogen-like compounds and aromatase inhibitors that mimic estrogen in function will be increased in effect, causing increased estrogen retention and increased drug retention.
- Etoposide interferes with grapefruit, orange, and apple juices.
- Fexofenadine (Allegra) concentrations are decreased rather than increased as is the case with most grapefruit–drug interactions.
- Fluvoxamine (Luvox, Faverin, Fevarin and Dumyrox)
- Imatinib (Gleevec): Although no formal studies with imatinib and grapefruit juice have been conducted, the fact that grapefruit juice is a known inhibitor of the CYP 3A4 suggests that co-administration may lead to increased imatinib plasma concentrations. Likewise, although no formal studies were conducted, co-administration of imatinib with another specific type of citrus juice called Seville orange juice (SOJ) may lead to increased imatinib plasma concentrations via inhibition of the CYP3A isoenzymes. Seville orange juice is not usually consumed as a juice because of its sour taste, but it is found in marmalade and other jams. Seville orange juice has been reported to be a possible inhibitor of CYP3A enzymes without affecting MDR1 when taken concomitantly with ciclosporin.
- Ketamine: After drinking 200 mL of grapefruit juice daily for five days, the overall absorption of orally ingested ketamine was increased three-fold compared to the control group in a clinical trial. The peak blood ketamine concentration was increased over two-fold.
- Levothyroxine (Eltroxin, Levoxyl, Synthroid): "Grapefruit juice may slightly delay the absorption of levothyroxine, but it seems to have only a minor effect on its bioavailability."
- Losartan (Cozaar)
- Methadone: Inhibits the metabolism of methadone and raises serum levels.
- Omeprazole (Losec, Prilosec)
- Oxycodone: Grapefruit juice enhances the exposure to oral oxycodone. In a randomized, controlled trial 12 healthy volunteers ingested 200 mL of either grapefruit juice or water three times daily for five days. On the fourth day 10 mg of oxycodone hydrochloride were administered orally. Analgesic and behavioral effects were reported for 12 hours and plasma samples were analyzed for oxycodone metabolites for 48 hours. Grapefruit juice increased the mean area under the oxycodone concentration-time curve (AUC(0-∞)) by 1.7 fold, the peak plasma concentration by 1.5-fold and the half-life of oxycodone by 1.2-fold as compared to water. The metabolite-to-parent ratios of noroxycodone and noroxymorphone decreased by 44% and 45% respectively. Oxymorphone AUC(0-∞) increased by 1.6-fold but the metabolite-to-parent ratio remained unchanged.
- Quetiapine (Seroquel)
- Repaglinide (Prandin)
- Sirolimus (Rapamycin, Rapamune)
- Tamoxifen (Nolvadex): Tamoxifen is metabolized by CYP2D6 into its active metabolite 4-hydroxytamoxifen. Grapefruit juice may potentially reduce the effectiveness of tamoxifen.
- Trazodone (Desyrel): Little or no interaction with grapefruit juice.
- Verapamil (Calan SR, Covera HS, Isoptin SR, Verelan): atrioventricular conduction disorders.
- Warfarin (coumadin)
- Zolpidem (Ambien): Little or no interaction with grapefruit juice

Drugs affected by grapefruit juice
Drug class	Major interactions	Minor interactions
Antiarrhythmic agents	amiodarone (Cordarone); dronedarone (Multaq); dofetilide (Tikosyn)	
Antihistamines	terfenadine (Seldane) (off the market); diphenhydramine (Benadryl) (partially); astemizole (Hismanal) (off the market)	
Calcium channel antagonists		felodipine (Plendil); nicardipine (Cardene); nifedipine (Procardia); nimodipine (Nimotop); nisoldipine (Sular); isradipine (DynaCirc)
Statins (HMG-CoA reductase inhibitors)	simvastatin (Zocor); lovastatin (Mevacor); atorvastatin (Lipitor); cerivastatin (Baycol) (off the market)	
Cough suppressant/NMDA antagonist	dextromethorphan	
Erectile dysfunction drugs		sildenafil (Viagra); tadalafil (Cialis); vardenafil (Levitra)
HIV protease inhibitors		saquinavir (Invirase); ritonavir (Norvir); nelfinavir (Viracept); amprenavir (Agenerase)
Hormones		ethinylestradiol (Ortho-Cept, many others); methylprednisolone (Medrol)
Immunosuppressants		ciclosporin (Sandimmune Neoral); tacrolimus (Prograf); sirolimus (Rapamune); mercaptopurine
Sedatives, hypnotics, and anxiolytics	buspirone (Buspar)	triazolam (Halcion); midazolam (Versed); diazepam (Valium); zaleplon (Sonata); alprazolam (Xanax); clonazepam (Klonopin); ketamine
Other psychotropics		carbamazepine (Tegretol); trazodone (Desyrel); quetiapine (Seroquel); fluvoxamine (Luvox); nefazodone (Serzone)
Other miscellaneous drugs	cisapride (Prepulsid, Propulsid); ivabradine (Corlanor)	
