= 6',7'-Dihydroxybergamottin =

Names
- IUPAC name 4-[(E,6R)-6,7-dihydroxy-3,7-dimethyloct-2-enoxy]furo[3,2-g]chromen-7-one

Identifiers
CAS Number	145414-76-2
3D model (JSmol)	Interactive image
ChemSpider	4944758
KEGG	C22156
PubChem CID	156147
UNII	S2O194AWTV
CompTox Dashboard (EPA)	DTXSID901045472
- InChI: InChI=1S/C21H24O6/c1-13(4-6-18(22)21(2,3)24)8-10-26-20-14-5-7-19(23)27-17(14)12-16-15(20)9-11-25-16/h5,7-9,11-12,18,22,24H,4,6,10H2,1-3H3/b13-8+ Key: IXZUPBUEKFXTSD-MDWZMJQESA-N
- SMILES: O=C\1Oc3c(/C=C/1)c(OC\C=C(/C)CCC(O)C(O)(C)C)c2ccoc2c3

Properties
Chemical formula	C_{21}H_{24}O_{6}
Molar mass	372.417 g·mol^{−1}
- Except where otherwise noted, data are given for materials in their standard state (at 25 °C [77 °F], 100 kPa). Infobox references

6',7'-Dihydroxybergamottin is a natural furanocoumarin found in pomelos, grapefruits, and sour oranges, in both the peel and the pulp. Along with the chemically related compound bergamottin, it is believed to be responsible for a number of grapefruit–drug interactions, in which the consumption of citrus containing one or both of these compounds (especially grapefruit) affects the metabolism of a variety of pharmaceutical drugs.
