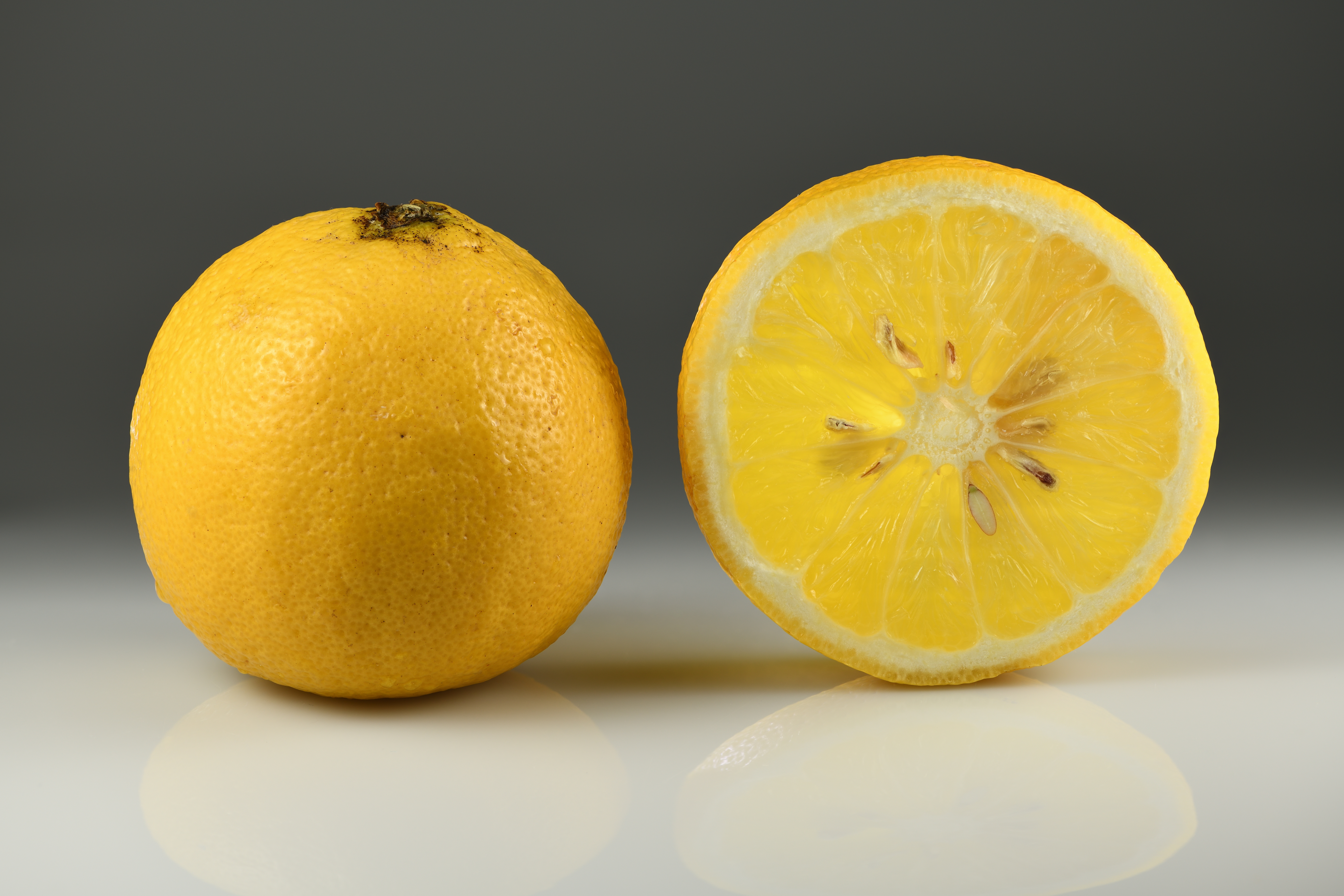

Scientific classification
- Kingdom: Plantae
- Clade: Tracheophytes
- Clade: Angiosperms
- Clade: Eudicots
- Clade: Rosids
- Order: Sapindales
- Family: Rutaceae
- Genus: Citrus
- Species: C. bergamia

Binomial name
- Citrus bergamia Risso

Synonyms
- Citrus aurantium subsp. bergamia (Risso & Poit.) Wight & Arn. ex Engl.; Citrus aurantium var. bergamia Loisel

= Bergamot orange =

Citrus fruit

Citrus bergamia, commonly known as the bergamot orange (pronounced /ˈbɜːrɡəmɒt/), is a fragrant citrus fruit the size of an orange, with a yellow or green colour similar to a lime, depending on ripeness.

Genetic research into the ancestral origins of extant citrus cultivars found bergamot orange to be a probable hybrid of lemon (itself a hybrid between bitter orange and citron) and bitter orange. Extracts have been used as an aromatic ingredient in food, tea, snus, perfumes, and cosmetics. Use on the skin can increase photosensitivity, resulting in greater damage from sun exposure.

== Etymology ==
The word bergamot is derived from the French word bergamote, which is in turn derived from the Italian word bergamotta, named for Bergamo.

The similarly named bergamot pear is derived from Ottoman Turkish beg armudi (بك آرمودی, 'prince's pear').

== Description ==
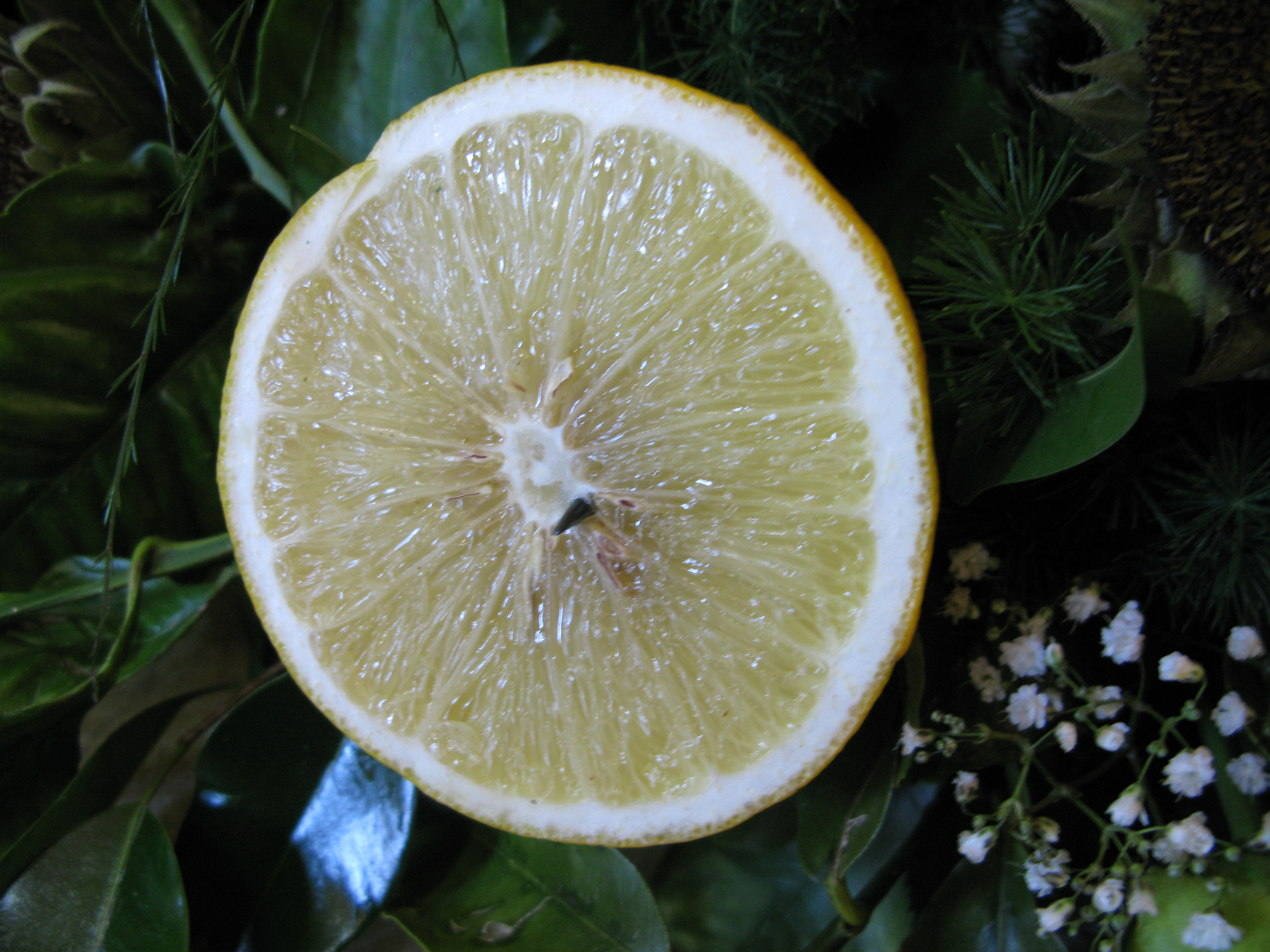
Bergamot orange cross section

Citrus bergamia is a small tree that blossoms during the winter. The juice tastes less sour than lemon, but more bitter than grapefruit.

=== Phytochemicals ===
Bergamot fruit or oil contains flavonoids, such as neoeriocitrin, naringin, neohesperidin, melitidin, brutieridin, and bergamottin. Bergamot leaves contain different indole alkaloids, such as N,N,N-trimethyltryptamine.

== Taxonomy ==
The bergamot orange is unrelated to the herbs known as bergamot, wild bergamot, bergamot mint, or bergamint – Monarda didyma, M. fistulosa, and Eau de Cologne mint (Mentha, disputed species). Those are all in the mint family, and are named for their similar aroma.

The C. bergamia is frequently misidentified as another citrus, C. hystrix (kaffir lime), due to the latter occasionally going by the name "Thai Bergamot". Citrus bergamia has also been classified as C. aurantium subsp. bergamia (i.e., a subspecies of bitter orange). C. bergamia is sometimes confused with C. medica (the citron, the yellow fruit of which is also known as etrog), and with C. limetta, the "sweet lemon" or "sweet lime".

== Production ==
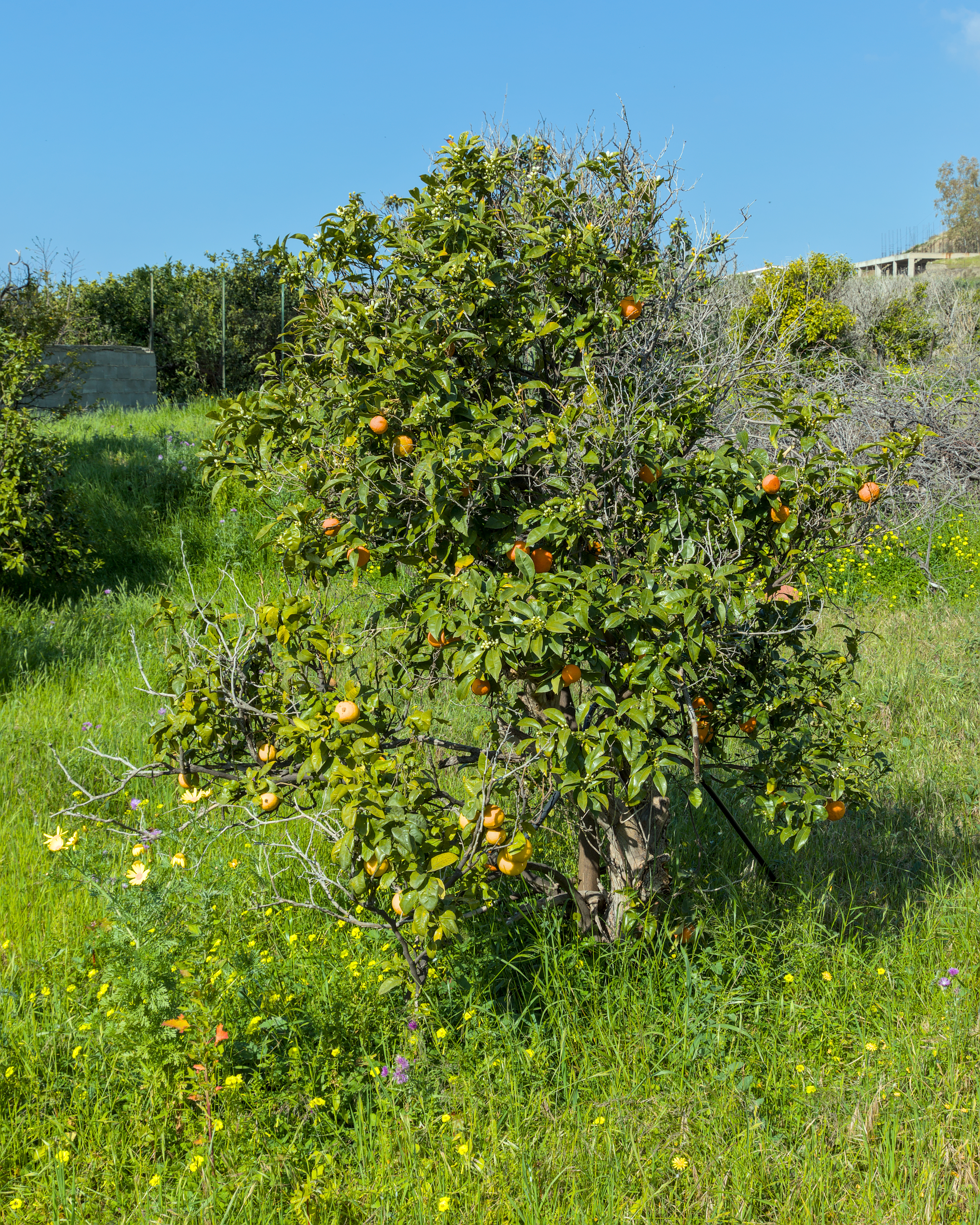
Bergamot tree in Melito di Porto Salvo, Calabria, Italy

The bergamot is a citrus fruit grown mostly in Mediterranean areas. Production is on large scale in the Ionian Sea coastal areas of the province of Reggio di Calabria in Italy, to such an extent that it is a symbol of the entire city. Most of the bergamot production of Italy is at this short stretch of coastal land, where the climate is favorable. There are three different cultivars of bergamot fruits that are traditionally grown, namely Feminello, Fantastico and Castagnaro.

Bergamot is also grown in southern France and the Ivory Coast for the essential oil, and in Antalya in southern Turkey for its marmalade. The fruit is not generally grown for juice consumption. However, in Mauritius where it is grown on a small-scale basis, it is consumed as juice by the locals. The fruit is also cultivated in Argentina, Brazil, North Africa, Iran and Greece.

One hundred bergamot oranges yield about 3 ounces (85 g) of bergamot oil.

Adulteration with cheaper products such as oil of rosewood and bergamot mint has been a problem for consumers. To protect the reputation of their produce, the Italian government introduced tight controls, including testing and certificates of purity. The Stazione Sperimentale per le Industrie delle Essenze e dei Derivati dagli Agrumi (Experimental Station for Essential Oil and Citrus By-Products) located in Reggio di Calabria, is the quality control body for the essential oil Bergamotto di Reggio Calabria DOP.

During World War II, Italy was unable to export to countries such as the Allied powers. Rival products from Brazil and Mexico came onto the market as a substitute, but these were produced from other citrus fruits such as sweet lime.

== Uses ==
=== Tea and other uses as a flavouring ===
Bergamot marmalade

An essence extracted from the aromatic skin of this sour fruit is used to flavour Earl Grey and Lady Grey teas, as well as confectionery (including Turkish delight). Bergamot is one of the most common "casings" (flavourings) added to Swedish snus, a smokeless tobacco product. The leftover peels were traditionally made into small souvenir boxes or snuff containers.

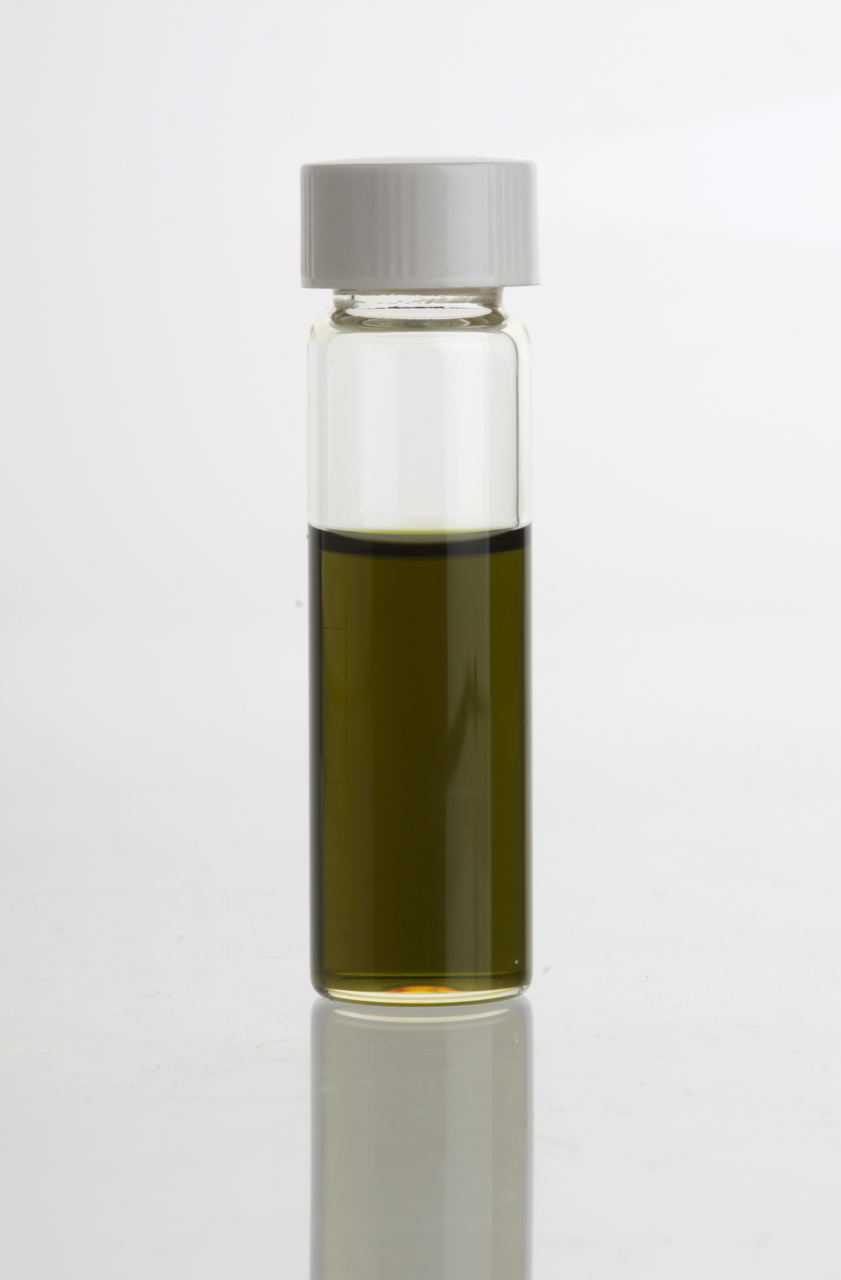
Essential oil

=== Fragrance ===
Bergamot oil is one of the most commonly used ingredients in perfumery. It is prized for its ability to combine with an array of scents to form a bouquet of aromas that complement each other. Bergamot is a major component of the original Eau de Cologne composed by Jean-Marie Farina at the beginning of the 18th century in Germany. Its citrus aroma is described as "citrus, floral, green, spicy, orange peel, ginger".

== Toxicology ==
In several patch test studies, application of some sources of bergamot oil directly to the skin of guinea pigs was shown to have a concentration-dependent phototoxic effect of increasing redness after exposure to ultraviolet light (due to the chemical bergapten, and possibly also citropten, bergamottin, geranial, and neral). This is a property shared by many other citrus fruits and other members of Rutaceae, including rue.

=== Skin effects ===
Used in cosmetics and perfume products, bergamot may cause skin irritation. In the past, psoralen extracted from bergamot oil was used in tanning accelerators and sunscreens. Known to be photocarcinogenic since 1959, the substances nonetheless were used in tanning activators until 1995, contributing to many cases of melanoma and death.

== Research ==
As of 2017, clinical research conducted on bergamot oil has been of poor quality, with no conclusions about its possible biological effects. Consuming bergamot oil as a component of tea may cause muscle cramps. Use on the skin may be unsafe, particularly for children and pregnant women, and may cause rashes resulting from photodermatotoxicity.

== Gallery ==
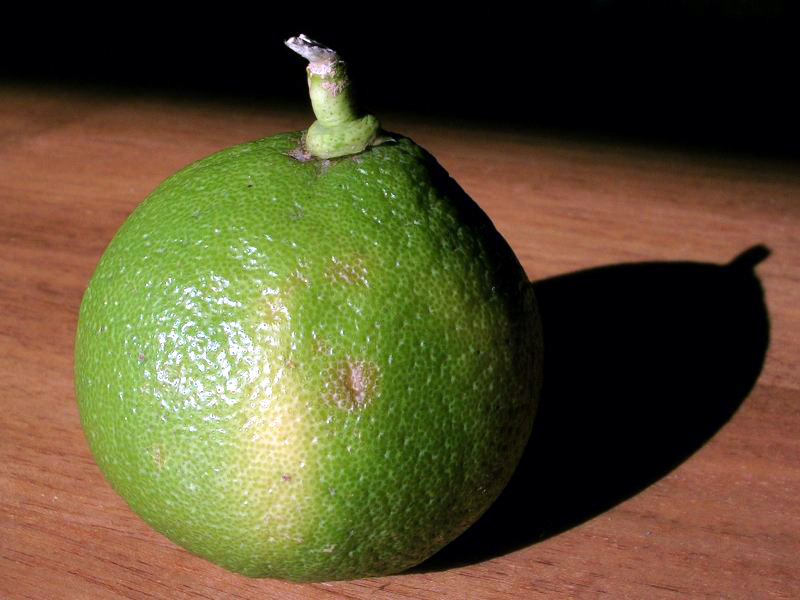
Unripe fruit

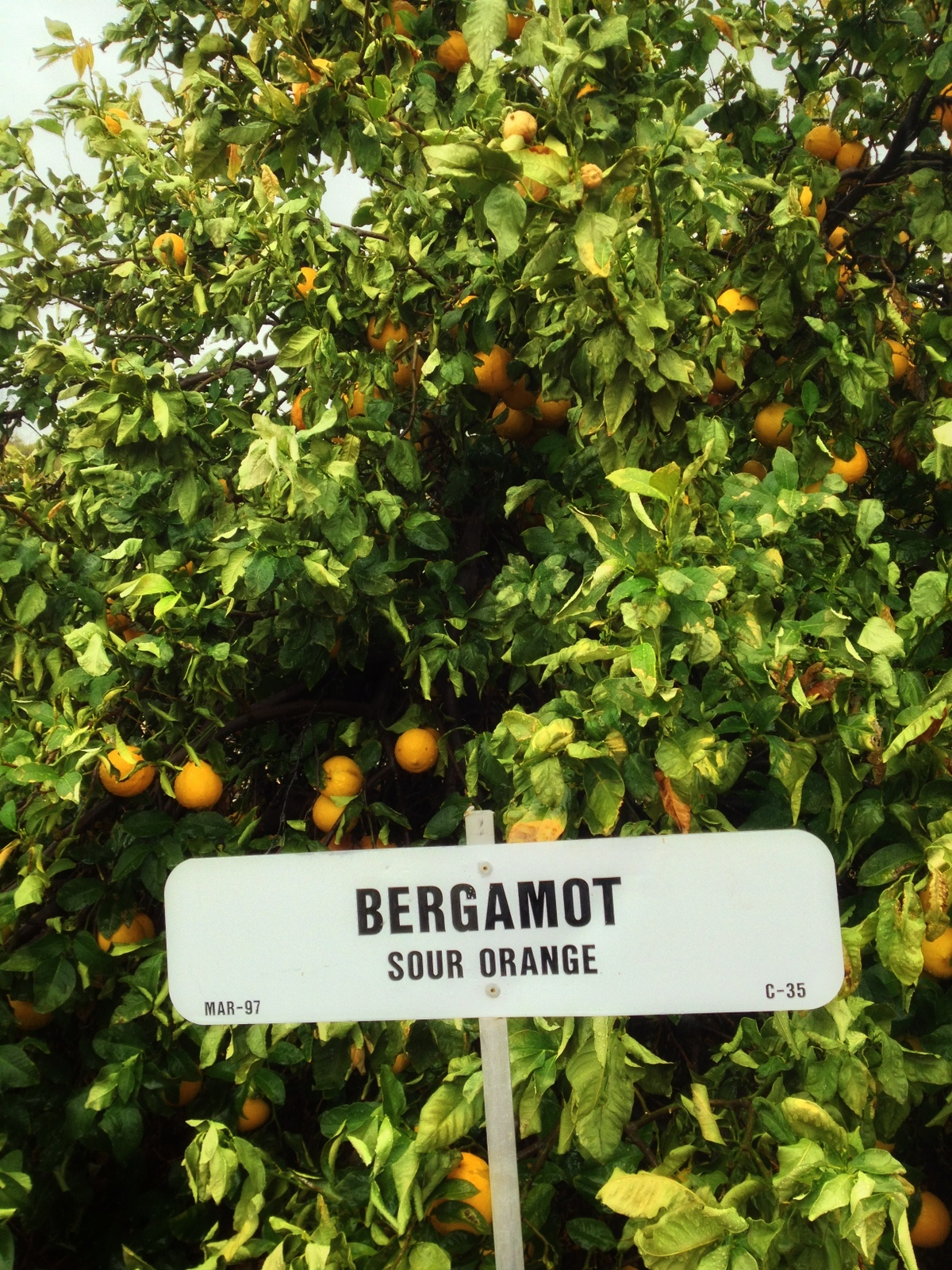
Tree in Arizona
