= Methoxypsoralen =

Methoxypsoralen may refer to:

- 5-Methoxypsoralen (Bergapten)
- 8-Methoxypsoralen (Methoxsalen)
