= Linalyl acetate =

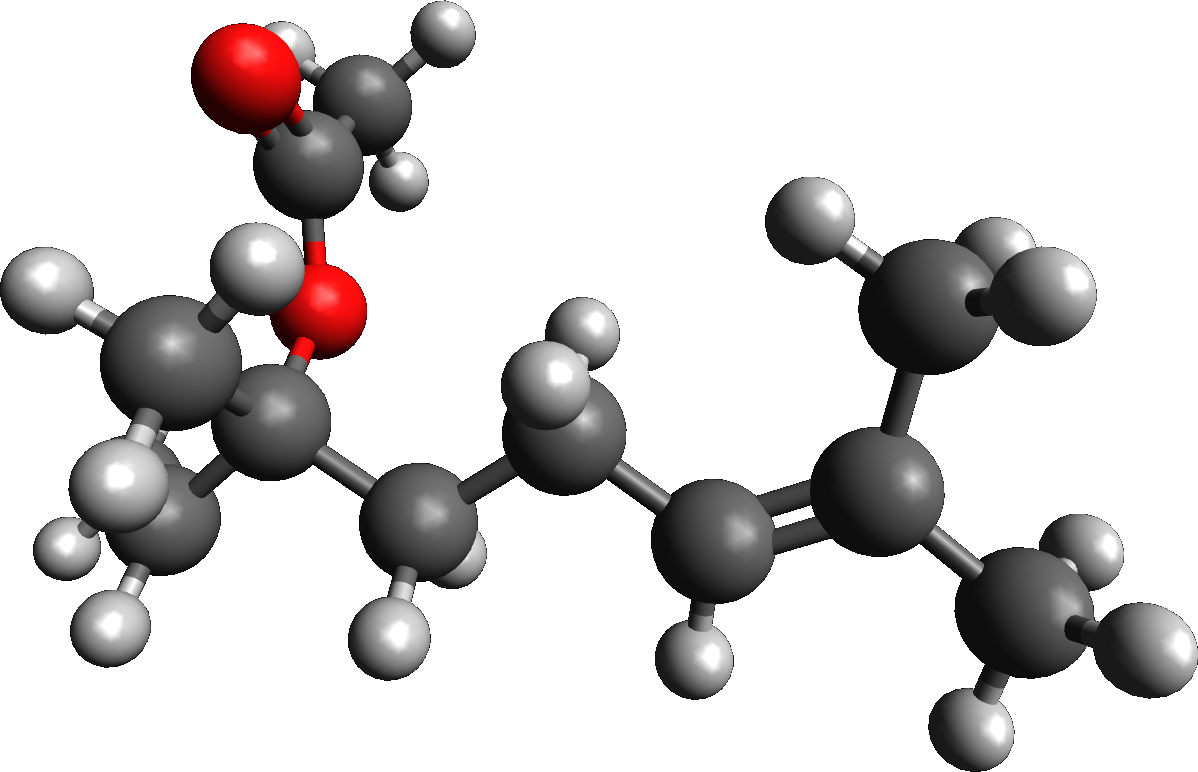

Names
- IUPAC name 3,7-Dimethylocta-1,6-dien-3-yl acetate
- Other names: Bergamiol; Bergamol; Linalool acetate

Identifiers
CAS Number	115-95-7
3D model (JSmol)	Interactive image
ChEBI	CHEBI:6469
ChEMBL	ChEMBL502773
ChemSpider	13850082
ECHA InfoCard	100.003.743
PubChem CID	8294
UNII	5K47SSQ51G
CompTox Dashboard (EPA)	DTXSID7026946
- InChI: InChI=1S/C12H20O2/c1-6-12(5,14-11(4)13)9-7-8-10(2)3/h6,8H,1,7,9H2,2-5H3 Key: UWKAYLJWKGQEPM-UHFFFAOYSA-N; InChI=1/C12H20O2/c1-6-12(5,14-11(4)13)9-7-8-10(2)3/h6,8H,1,7,9H2,2-5H3 Key: UWKAYLJWKGQEPM-UHFFFAOYAM
- SMILES: C\C(C)=C\CCC(C)(C=C)OC(=O)C

Properties
Chemical formula	C_{12}H_{20}O_{2}
Molar mass	196.290 g·mol^{−1}
Appearance	Colorless liquid
Density	0.895 g/cm^{3}
Boiling point	220 °C (428 °F; 493 K)
Solubility in water	Insoluble
Solubility in organic solvents	Soluble

Hazards
Flash point	69.6 °C (157.3 °F; 342.8 K)
- Except where otherwise noted, data are given for materials in their standard state (at 25 °C [77 °F], 100 kPa). verify (what is ?) Infobox references

Linalyl acetate is an organic compound, the acetate ester of linalool and a phytochemical found in many flowers and spice plants. It is one of the principal components of the essential oils of bergamot, lavender and lemon. It often occurs together with linalool and is a widely used fragrance.

The chemical tastes similar to how it smells with a pleasant fruity odor reminiscent of bergamot mint oil. It is found in Eau de Cologne mint and is mildly toxic to humans, toxic to fish, and extremely toxic to daphnia. Linalyl acetate is also combustible.

The racemic form of linalyl acetate has an aroma described as "sweet, green, citrus, bergamot, lavender, woody, floral, spicy, clean, terpenic".

== Safety ==
Linalyl acetate is found safe as a fragrance material under current levels of use.

== See also ==
- Bergamot essential oil
