= Dimethoxycoumarin =

Dimethoxycoumarin may refer to:

- Citropten (5,7-dimethoxycoumarin)
- Scoparone (6,7-dimethoxycoumarin)
