= Phytophotodermatitis =

- Other names: Berloque dermatitis, margarita photodermatitis, margarita burn, lime disease or lime phytodermatitis
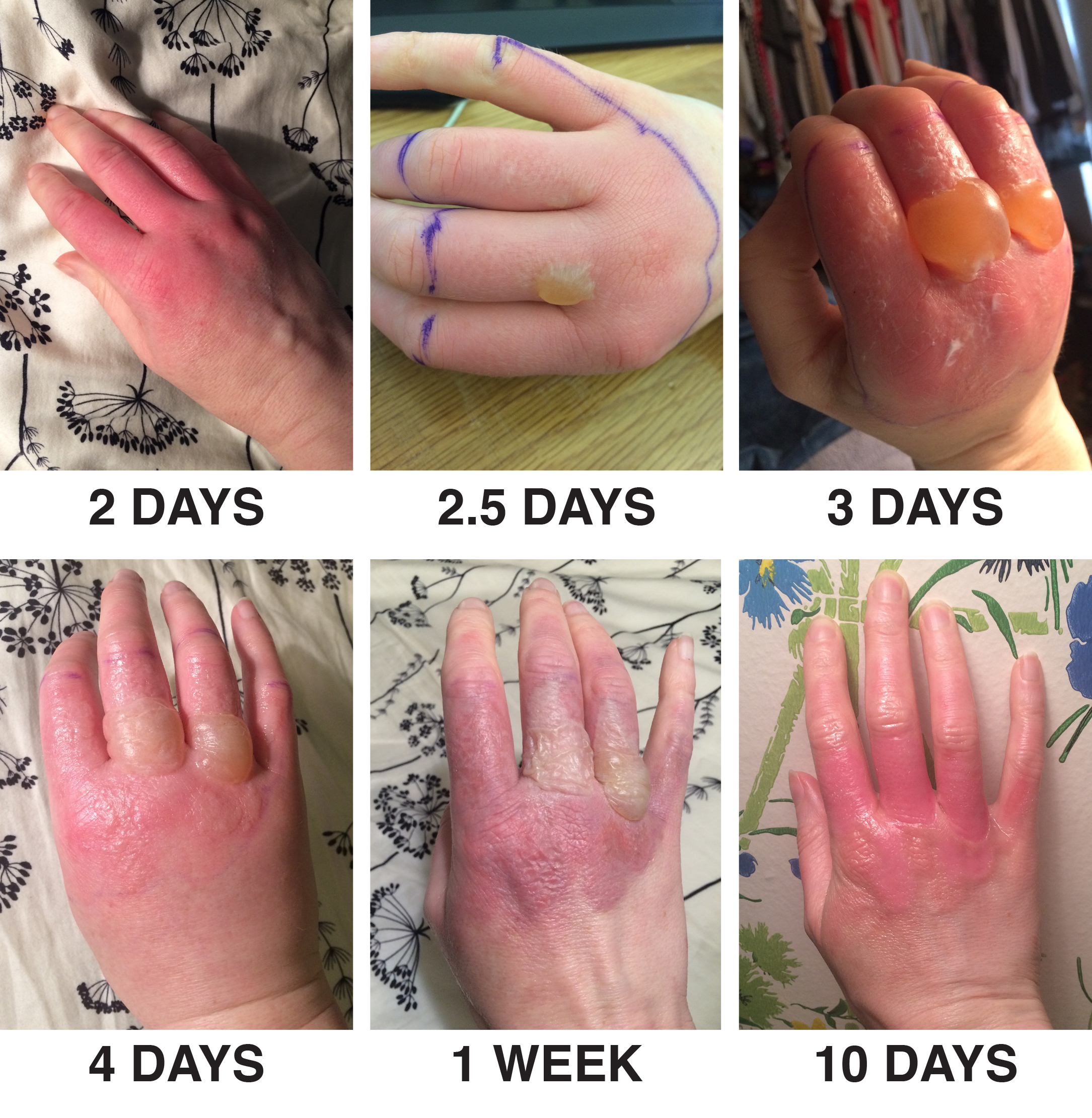
- Phytophotodermatitis caused by lime juice
- Specialty: Dermatology
- Causes: Photosensitizer and UV-A light
- Differential diagnosis: Skin burn; allergic contact dermatitis

Phytophotodermatitis is a phototoxic inflammatory reaction of the skin resulting from contact with a light-sensitizing botanical agent (such as lime juice) followed by exposure to ultraviolet A (UV-A) light (from the sun, for instance). Symptoms include erythema, edema, blisters (vesicles and/or bullae), and delayed hyperpigmentation. Heat and moisture tend to exacerbate the reaction.

A reaction may be elicited in any person who has been exposed to adequate amounts of both a photosensitizer and UV-A light. Phytophotodermatitis is not an immunologic response; no prior exposure to the photosensitizing agent is required.

The photosensitizing substances found in phototoxic plants belong to a class of chemical compounds called the furanocoumarins, which are activated by long-wavelength ultraviolet (UV-A) light. The most toxic of these organic compounds are the linear furanocoumarins, so called since they exhibit a linear chemical structure. Bergapten and xanthotoxin (also known as methoxsalen), two linear furanocoumarins derived from psoralen, are invariably found in plants associated with phytophotodermatitis.

== Signs and symptoms ==
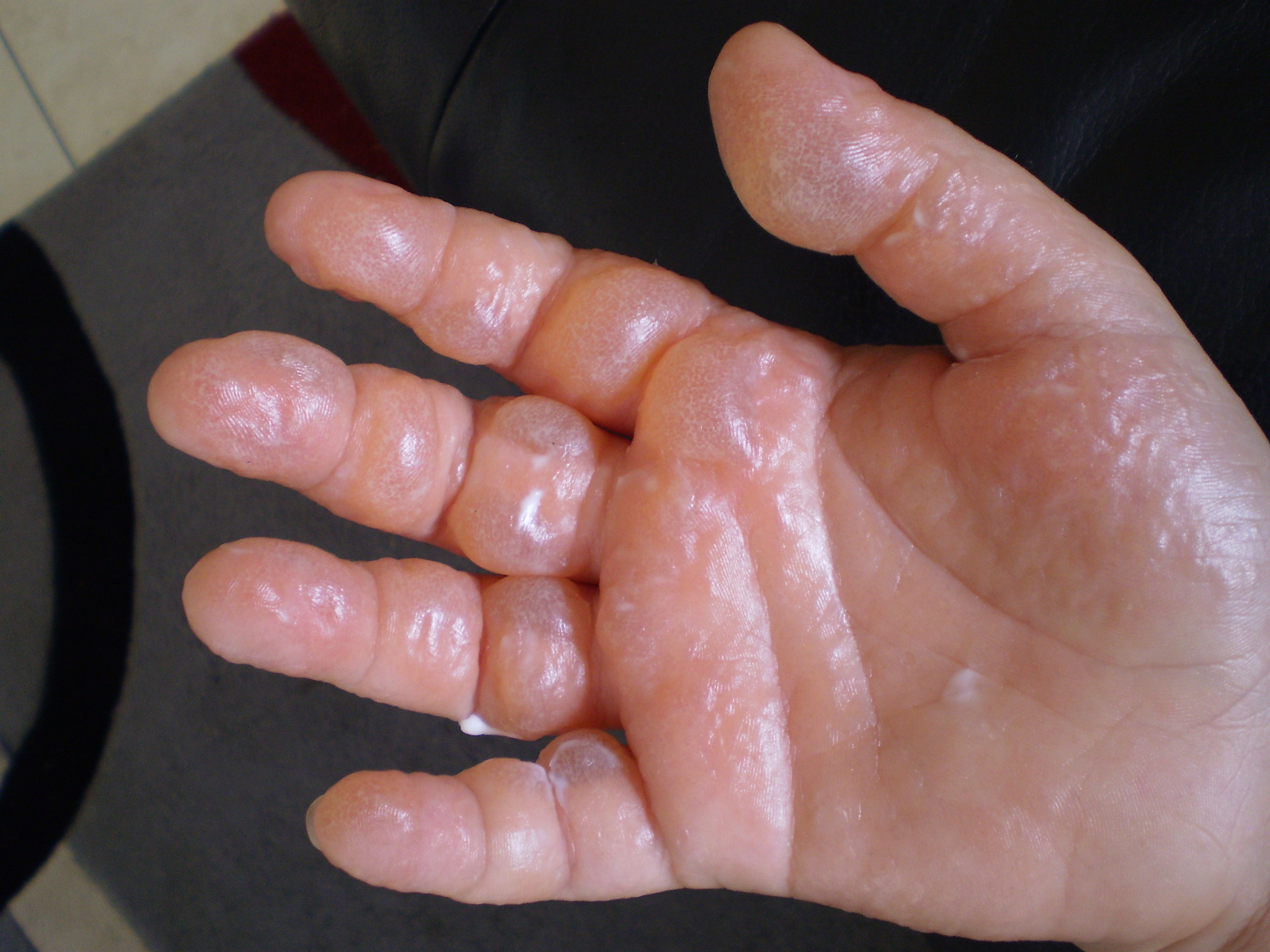
A severe case of phytophotodermatitis in an 11-year-old.

A reaction typically begins within 24 hours of exposure and peaks at 48–72 hours after exposure. Initially, the skin turns red and starts to itch and burn. Large blisters (or bullae) form within 48 hours. The blisters may leave black, brown, or purplish scars that can last for several years. This hyperpigmentation of the skin is caused by the production of melanin triggered by the furanocoumarins.

Although media reports have suggested that eye exposure to the agent can lead to temporary or permanent blindness, the risk of permanent blindness is not supported by existing research.

Phytophotodermatitis can affect people of any age. In children, it has sometimes been mistaken for child abuse.

== Causes ==
Plants associated with phytophotodermatitis mainly come from four plant families: the carrot family (Apiaceae), the citrus family (Rutaceae), the mulberry family (Moraceae), and the legume family (Fabaceae).

=== Apiaceae ===
The carrot family Apiaceae (or Umbelliferae) is the main family of plants associated with phytophotodermatitis. Of all the plant species that have been reported to induce phytophotodermatitis, approximately half belong to the family Apiaceae.

False bishop's weed (Ammi majus), the world's major source of the linear furanocoumarin xanthotoxin, has been used since antiquity to treat vitiligo but accidental or inappropriate use of this plant can lead to phytophotodermatitis. Despite this danger, A. majus continues to be cultivated for its furanocoumarins, which are still used for the treatment of skin disease.

Numerous species in the family Apiaceae are cultivated as food products, some of which exhibit phototoxic effects. In particular, celery, parsnip, and parsley have been reported to cause phytophotodermatitis among agricultural workers, grocery workers, and other occupational food handlers.

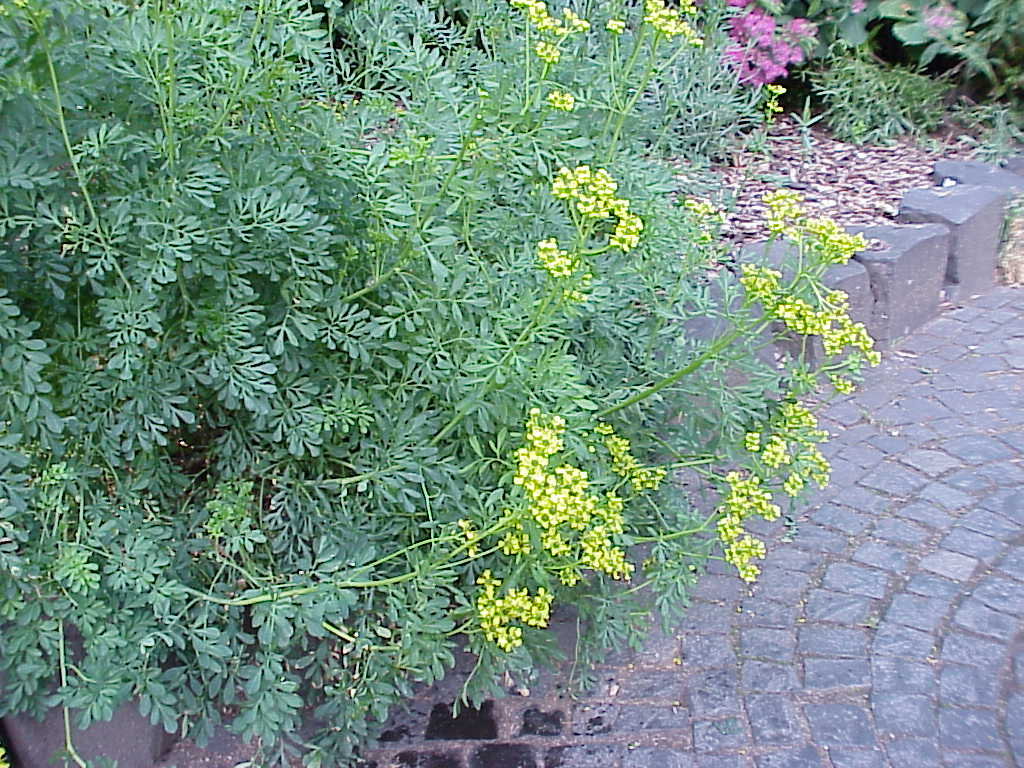
Ruta graveolens is the main cause of phytophotodermatitis.

A number of phototoxic plant species in the carrot family have become invasive species, including wild parsnip (Pastinaca sativa) and the tall hogweeds of the genus Heracleum, namely, Persian hogweed (Heracleum persicum), Sosnowsky's hogweed (Heracleum sosnowskyi), and giant hogweed (Heracleum mantegazzianum). In particular, the public health risks of giant hogweed are well known.

Other plant species in the family Apiaceae that are associated with phytophotodermatitis include blister bush (Notobubon galbanum), cow parsley (Anthriscus sylvestris), wild carrot (Daucus carota), various species of the genus Angelica (e.g., Korean angelica Angelica gigas), and most (if not all) species of the genus Heracleum (esp. the tall invasive hogweeds and the cow parsnips, Heracleum sphondylium and Heracleum maximum).

=== Rutaceae ===
The citrus family Rutaceae is the second most widely distributed family of plants associated with phytophotodermatitis.

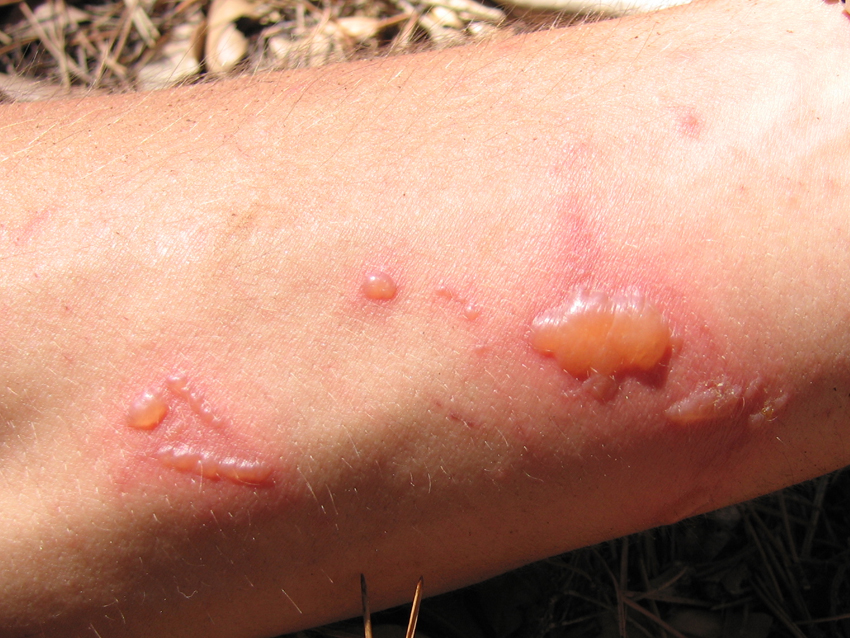
Effect of common rue on skin

Numerous citrus fruits in the family Rutaceae exhibit phototoxic effects. Of these, perhaps the best known is lime. Phytophotodermatitis associated with limes is sometimes colloquially referred to as "lime disease," not to be confused with Lyme disease.

In the family Rutaceae, the most severe reactions are caused by the essential oil of the bergamot orange (Citrus bergamia). Bergamot essential oil has a higher concentration of bergapten (3000–3600 mg/kg) than any other citrus-based essential oil, even lime oil, which contains 1700–3300 mg/kg of bergapten.

Other plant species in the family Rutaceae that are associated with phytophotodermatitis include burning bush (Dictamnus albus), common rue (Ruta graveolens), and other plants in the genus Ruta.

=== Moraceae ===
The mulberry family Moraceae is often associated with phytophotodermatitis. Multiple species in the genus Ficus are known to exhibit phototoxic effects. Of these, the common fig (Ficus carica) is well known and thoroughly documented.

Like Ammi majus in the family Apiaceae, the common fig has been used since antiquity to treat vitiligo but the milky sap of fig leaves can cause phytophotodermatitis if used accidentally or inappropriately. A literature search revealed 19 cases of fig leaf-induced phytophotodermatitis reported between 1984 and 2012. In Brazil, several hospitals reported more than 50 cases of fig leaf-induced burn in one summer. In most cases, patients reportedly used the leaves of the fig plant for folk remedies, tanning, or gardening.

Other plant species in the family Moraceae that are associated with phytophotodermatitis include Ficus pumila and Brosimum gaudichaudii. Like Ficus carica, the South American species Brosimum gaudichaudii has been shown to contain both psoralen and bergapten.

== Prevention ==
The first and best line of defense against phytophotodermatitis is to avoid contact with phototoxic substances in the first place:

- Avoid contact with the plant family Apiaceae, citrus fruits, and other biological agents known to have phototoxic effects. Do not incinerate phototoxic plants and agents since this will serve to disperse the phototoxic substances more widely.
- In outdoor situations where contact with phototoxic plants is likely, wear long trousers and a long-sleeve shirt. Wear gloves and protective eyewear before handling such plants.
- If protective clothing is not available, apply sunscreen to exposed areas. This will provide some measure of protection if contact is made.
- After an outdoor activity, take a shower or a bath as soon as possible. Wash your clothing and then wash your hands after handling the dirty clothes.

A second line of defense is to avoid sunlight, so as not to activate a phototoxic substance:

- If you come in contact with a phototoxic substance, immediately wash the affected area with soap and cold water, and avoid any further exposure to sunlight for at least 48 hours. Heat and moisture can worsen the skin reaction, which is why cold water is required.
- Stay indoors, if possible. Be sure to avoid light shining through windows.
- If staying indoors is not an option, cover the affected area with sun protective clothing.
- In lieu of sun-protective clothing, apply sunscreen to the affected areas after washing.

Phytophotodermatitis is triggered by long wavelength ultraviolet light (called UVA) in the range of 320–380 nanometers, so the best sun-protective clothing and sunscreen products will block these wavelengths of UVA radiation.

In 2011, the U.S. Food and Drug Administration (FDA) established a "broad spectrum" test for determining a sunscreen product's UVA protection. Sunscreen products that pass the test are allowed to be labeled as "Broad Spectrum" sunscreens, which protect against both UVA and UVB rays.

There is no equivalent test or FDA-approved labeling for sun-protective clothing. Some clothing is labeled with an Ultraviolet Protection Factor (UPF) but test results from Consumer Reports suggest that UPF is an unreliable indicator of UV protection.

== Treatment ==
Many different topical and oral medications may be used to treat the inflammatory reaction of phytophotodermatitis. A dermatologist may also prescribe a whitening cream to help treat the hyperpigmentation and return the skin pigmentation back to normal. If the patient does not receive treatment, the affected sites may develop permanent hyperpigmentation or hypopigmentation.

== History ==
The photosensitizing effects of plants have been known since antiquity. In Egypt around 2000 B.C., the juice of Ammi majus "was rubbed on patches of vitiligo after which patients were encouraged to lie in the sun." In A.D. 50, the Greek physician Dioscorides observed that pigment would return to patches of vitiligo if "cataplasmed with the leaves or the boughes of the Black Figge," an apparent reference to Ficus carica, the common fig. These ancient practices acknowledged the hyperpigmentation effects now known to accompany phytophotodermatitis.

One of the earliest reports of plant-based dermatitis was given by Chaumton in 1815, who noted that the outer rind and root of cow parsnip (a common name for any Heracleum species of plant) contained an acrid sap sufficiently strong to inflame and ulcerate the skin. Similarly in 1887 Sornevin reported that Heracleum sphondylium caused dermatitis. However, neither of these early reports recognized the crucial role of ultraviolet radiation.

"Berloque dermatitis" (from the French word "berloque" meaning trinket or charm) is a term coined by Rosenthal in 1925 to describe the pendant-like streaks of pigmentation observed on the neck, face, and arms of patients. He was unaware that in 1916, Freund had correctly observed that these pigmentation effects were due to sun exposure after the use of Eau de Cologne, a perfume infused with bergamot oil. It is now known that bergamot oil contains a significant amount of bergapten, a linear furanocoumarin that gets its name from the bergamot orange.

In 1937, dermatitis from Heracleum mantegazzianum was reported by Miescher and Burckhardt who suspected the possibility of light sensitization. A few years later, Kuske confirmed this hypothesis. In 1942, Klaber introduced the term "phytophotodermatitis" to emphasize that both plants and light were required to affect a reaction.

Darrell Wilkinson, a British dermatologist, gave an accurate description of the clinical entity in the 1950s. In 1961, Efremov reported 357 cases of phytophotodermatitis from Heracleum dulce (sweet cow parsnip). He "noted the requirement for sunlight in evoking the dermatitis since inunction of the juice of the plant without exposure to sunlight was harmless." Between 1962 and 1976, numerous reports of phytophotodermatitis from giant hogweed (Heracleum mantegazzianum) were reported. By 1980, the photosensitizing effects of various plant species had become well known (as evidenced by the comprehensive work of Mitchell and Rook).

== See also ==
- List of cutaneous conditions
- Photodermatitis
- Psoralen
- Photosensitivity in humans
- Stinging plant, plants with fragile silica hairs that inject venoms
