= Psoralen synthase =

Class of enzymes

Identifiers
- EC no.: 1.14.14.141

Databases
- IntEnz: IntEnz view
- BRENDA: BRENDA entry
- ExPASy: NiceZyme view
- KEGG: KEGG entry
- MetaCyc: metabolic pathway
- PRIAM: profile
- PDB structures: RCSB PDB PDBe PDBsum
Search
- PMC: articles
- PubMed: articles
- NCBI: proteins

Psoralen synthase (EC 1.14.14.141) is an enzyme that catalyzes the chemical reaction

(+)-marmesin
O_{2}
2 H_{2}O
psoralen
+
acetone

The enzyme is a cytochrome P450 protein containing heme, isolated from Ammi majus. It uses molecular oxygen for the oxidation and requires a partner cytochrome P450 reductase for functional expression. This uses nicotinamide adenine dinucleotide phosphate. The oxidoreductase is also called CYP71AJ1.
