= Marmesin =

Names
- Preferred IUPAC name (2S)-2-(2-Hydroxypropan-2-yl)-2,3-dihydro-7H-furo[3,2-g][1]benzopyran-7-one
- Other names Nodakenetin

Identifiers
| CAS Number | 13849-08-6 |
| 3D model (JSmol) | Interactive image |
| ChEMBL | ChEMBL442813 |
| ChemSpider | 296611 |
| PubChem CID | 334704 |
| UNII | H5D33D6K5D |
| CompTox Dashboard (EPA) | DTXSID001030448 |
- InChI: InChI=1S/C14H14O4/c1-14(2, 16)12-6-9-5-8-3-4-13(15)18-10(8)7-11(9)17-12/h3-5,7,12,16H,6H2, 1-2H3/t12-/m0/s1 Key: FWYSBEAFFPBAQU-LBPRGKRZSA-N
- SMILES: CC(C)([C@@H]1CC2=C(O1)C=C3C(=C2)C=CC(=O)O3)O

Properties
| Chemical formula | C_{14}H_{14}O_{4} |
| Molar mass | 246.262 g·mol^{−1} |
- Except where otherwise noted, data are given for materials in their standard state (at 25 °C [77 °F], 100 kPa). Infobox references

Marmesin (nodakenetin) is a chemical compound precursor in psoralen and linear furanocoumarins biosynthesis.

Marmesin plays a central role in the biosynthesis of furocoumarins in the plant Ruta graveolens, more commonly known as rue. It is the biosynthetic precursor for psoralen and other furocoumarins present in rue. It also a constituent of Aegle marmelos, Ammi majus, Poncirus trifoliata and Prangos bucharica and others

== Spectra ==
=== IR Spectra ===
IR (ATR): νmax 3480, 2971, 1699, 1631, 1488 cm-1.

=== Proton-NMR ===
1H-NMR (300 MHz, CDCl3): δ 7.59 (d, J = 9.5 Hz, 1H, aromatic), 7.22 (s, 1H, aromatic), 6.75 (d, J = 21.6 Hz, 1H, aromatic), 6.20 (d, J = 9.5 Hz, 1H, aromatic), 4.74 (t, J = 8.8 Hz, 1H, CH), 3.28-3.15 (m, 2H, CH2), 1.87 (s, 1H, OH), 1.37 (s, 3H, CH3), 1.24 (s, 3H, CH3) ppm.

=== UV-Vis ===
UV: [neutral]λmax 217 (ε7420); 338 (ε17700)( MeOH) [neutral]λmax 332( EtOH).

== Laboratory synthesis ==
Synthesis of marmesin has been successfully conducted in the laboratory on multiple occasions. One way of doing so is by a strategy based on the palladium-catalyzed intramolecular coupling reaction. This reaction would construct the dihydropyran ring and synthesize the compound from the intermediate (-)-peucedanol. The key step in the overall synthesis uses catalytic asymmetric epoxidation of an enone.

== Metabolism in plants ==
(+)-Marmesin is converted to psoralen by the enzyme psoralen synthase.

(+)-marmesin
O_{2}
2 H_{2}O
psoralen
+
acetone

This is part of the pathway to a group of natural products called furanocoumarins.
