= 5-Geranyloxy-7-methoxycoumarin =

Names
- Preferred IUPAC name 5-{[(2E)-3,7-Dimethylocta-2,6-dien-1-yl]oxy}-7-methoxy-2H-1-benzopyran-2-one
- Other names 5-Geranoxy-7-methoxycoumarin

Identifiers
CAS Number	7380-39-4
3D model (JSmol)	Interactive image
ChemSpider	4945553
PubChem CID	6441377
UNII	39A7K6NN3W
CompTox Dashboard (EPA)	DTXSID001045382
- InChI: InChI=1S/C20H24O4/c1-14(2)6-5-7-15(3)10-11-23-18-12-16(22-4)13-19-17(18)8-9-20(21)24-19/h6,8-10,12-13H,5,7,11H2,1-4H3/b15-10+ Key: WXUOSNJWDJOHGW-XNTDXEJSSA-N; InChI=1/C20H24O4/c1-14(2)6-5-7-15(3)10-11-23-18-12-16(22-4)13-19-17(18)8-9-20(21)24-19/h6,8-10,12-13H,5,7,11H2,1-4H3/b15-10+ Key: WXUOSNJWDJOHGW-XNTDXEJSBY
- SMILES: CC(=CCC/C(=C/COC1=C2C=CC(=O)OC2=CC(=C1)OC)/C)C

Properties
Chemical formula	C_{20}H_{24}O_{4}
Molar mass	328.408 g·mol^{−1}
- Except where otherwise noted, data are given for materials in their standard state (at 25 °C [77 °F], 100 kPa). Infobox references

5-Geranyloxy-7-methoxycoumarin is a natural coumarin with the molecular formula C_{20}H_{24}O_{4}. It is found in the essential oils of citrus such as bergamot.
