= Furanocoumarin =

Class of phyto-photo toxic compounds

Psoralen

Angelicin

Linear and angular furanocoumarin isomers

The furanocoumarins, or furocoumarins, are a class of organic chemical compounds produced by a variety of plants. Most of the plant species found to contain furanocoumarins belong to a handful of plant families. The families Apiaceae and Rutaceae (citrus family) include the largest numbers of plant species that contain furanocoumarins. The families Moraceae and Fabaceae include a few widely distributed plant species that contain furanocoumarins.

Generally, furanocoumarins are most abundant in plants that have flowered and in ripe seeds and fruits. (An exception is the common fig where furanocoumarins are found chiefly in the milky sap of the leaves and shoots but not the fruits.) During the early stages of plant growth, their presence is not easily detected.

== Structure ==
The chemical structure of furanocoumarins consists of a furan ring fused with a coumarin. The furan ring may be fused in various ways, producing several different isomers. The parent compounds of the most common isomers are psoralen and angelicin. Derivatives of these two compounds are referred to respectively as linear and angular furanocoumarins, so called since they exhibit a linear or angular chemical structure.

== Biosynthesis ==
The compounds are biosynthesized partly through the phenylpropanoid pathway and the mevalonate pathway, which is biosynthesized by a coupling of dimethylallyl pyrophosphate (DMAPP) and 7-hydroxycoumarin (umbelliferone).

== Effects ==
=== Toxicity ===
Furanocoumarins as phytochemicals enter the nucleus of epithelial cells and form a bond (cross-linking) with the DNA when exposed to UV, which causes cell death and causes inflammation via activation of the arachidonic acid cascade. The result is known as phytophotodermatitis, a serious skin inflammation.

Furanocoumarins produced by plants may serve as a antifeedants (defense against herbivores). It is also likely that furanocoumarins are related to a plant's natural defense against fungal attack. In particular, the linear furanocoumarins (psoralen, bergapten, and methoxsalen), which occur naturally in Apiaceae, Rutaceae, and other plant families, are known to be toxic to fungi. Plants that cause phytophotodermatitis usually contain linear furanocoumarins.

Furanocoumarins are found in the sap of plants such as Ammi majus, parsnip, and giant hogweed. At least 36 species of the genus Heracleum in the family Apiaceae are known to contain one or more furanocoumarin compounds.

The toxin has been reported in common foods, including carrots, parsley, limes, and lemons.

Furanocoumarin contaminates some bergamot oils, in which case it is removed by distillation before the oil is used as a cosmetic.

=== Medication interactions ===
Furanocoumarins have other biological effects as well. For example, in humans, bergamottin and 6',7'-dihydroxybergamottin are responsible for the "grapefruit juice effect", in which these furanocoumarins affect certain P450 liver and gut enzymes, such as the inhibition of CYP3A4 which either activates or deactivates many drugs, thus leading to higher or lower levels in the bloodstream. Furanocoumarins have various effects which can specifically increase or decrease (depending on the drug) the blood levels of many pharmaceuticals in ways that can be life-threatening, so FDA-approved drugs include warnings for grapefruit.

== See also ==
- Pyranocoumarin
- Naringin
