= Psoralen =

- Chemical structure of psoralen

Names
- Preferred IUPAC name 7H-Furo[3,2-g][1]benzopyran-7-one

Identifiers
CAS Number	66-97-7
3D model (JSmol)	Interactive image
Beilstein Reference	152784
ChEBI	CHEBI:27616
ChEMBL	ChEMBL164660
ChemSpider	5964
ECHA InfoCard	100.000.581
EC Number	200-639-7
KEGG	C09305; D08450
PubChem CID	6199
UNII	KTZ7ZCN2EX
CompTox Dashboard (EPA)	DTXSID00216205
- InChI: InChI=1S/C11H6O3/c12-11-2-1-7-5-8-3-4-13-9(8)6-10(7)14-11/h1-6H Key: ZCCUUQDIBDJBTK-UHFFFAOYSA-N
- SMILES: O=C1/C=C\c2cc3ccoc3cc2O1

Properties
Chemical formula	C_{11}H_{6}O_{3}
Molar mass	186.16 g/mol
Melting point	158 to 161 °C (316 to 322 °F; 431 to 434 K)

Hazards
- GHS labelling
Pictograms	(GHS07: Exclamation mark)
Signal word	Warning
Hazard statements	H302, H315, H319, H335
Precautionary statements	P261, P264, P270, P271, P280, P301+P312, P302+P352, P304+P340, P305+P351+P338, P312, P321, P330, P332+P313, P337+P313, P362, P403+P233, P405, P501
- Except where otherwise noted, data are given for materials in their standard state (at 25 °C [77 °F], 100 kPa). verify (what is ?) Infobox references

Psoralen (also called psoralene) is the parent compound in a family of naturally occurring organic compounds known as the linear furanocoumarins. It is structurally related to coumarin by the addition of a fused furan ring, and may be considered as a derivative of umbelliferone. Psoralen occurs naturally in the seeds of Psoralea corylifolia, as well as in the common fig, celery, parsley, West Indian satinwood, and in all citrus fruits. It is widely used in PUVA (psoralen + UVA) treatment for psoriasis, eczema, vitiligo, and cutaneous T-cell lymphoma; these applications are typically through the use of medications such as methoxsalen. Many furanocoumarins are extremely toxic to fish, and some are used in Indonesia to catch fish.

== Uses ==
Psoralen is a mutagen, and is used for this purpose in molecular biology research. Psoralen intercalates into DNA and on exposure to ultraviolet (UVA) radiation can form monoadducts and covalent interstrand cross-links (ICL) with thymines, preferentially at 5'-TpA sites in the genome, inducing apoptosis. Psoralen plus UVA (PUVA) therapy can be used to treat hyperproliferative skin disorders like psoriasis and certain kinds of skin cancer. Unfortunately, PUVA treatment itself leads to a higher risk of skin cancer.

An important use of psoralen is in PUVA treatment for skin problems such as psoriasis and, to a lesser extent, eczema and vitiligo. This takes advantage of the high UV absorbance of psoralen. The psoralen is applied first to sensitise the skin, then UVA light is applied to address the condition. Psoralens are also used in photopheresis, where they are mixed with the extracted leukocytes before UV radiation is applied.

Despite the photocarcinogenic properties of psoralen, it was used as a tanning activator in sunscreens until 1996. Psoralens are used in tanning accelerators, because psoralen increases the skin's sensitivity to light. Some patients have had severe skin loss after sunbathing with psoralen-containing tanning activators. Patients with lighter skin colour suffer four times as much from the melanoma-generating properties of psoralens than those with darker skin. Psoralens short term side effects include nausea, vomiting, erythema, pruritus, xerosis, skin pain due to phototoxic damage of dermal nerve, and cutaneous and genital skin malignancies.

An additional use for optimized psoralens is for the inactivation of pathogens in blood products. The synthetic amino-psoralen, amotosalen HCl, has been developed for the inactivation of infectious pathogens (bacteria, viruses, protozoa) in platelet and plasma blood components prepared for transfusion support of patients. Prior to clinical use, amotosalen-treated platelets have been tested and found to be non-carcinogenic when using the established p53 knockout mouse model. The technology is currently in routine use in certain European blood centers and has been recently approved in the US.

== Chemistry ==
Psoralen intercalates into the DNA double helix where it is ideally positioned to form one or more adducts with adjacent pyrimidine bases, preferentially thymine, upon excitation by an ultraviolet photon.

Several physicochemical methods have been employed to derive binding constants for psoralen-DNA interactions. Classically, two chambers of psoralen and buffered DNA solution are partitioned by a semi-permeable membrane; the affinity of the psoralen for DNA is directly related to the concentration of the psoralen in the DNA chamber after equilibrium. Water solubility is important for two reasons: pharmacokinetics relating to drug solubility in blood and necessitating the use of organic solvents (e.g. DMSO). Psoralens can also be activated by irradiation with long wavelength UV light. While UVA range light is the clinical standard, research that UVB is more efficient at forming photoadducts suggests that its use may lead to higher efficacy and lower treatment times.

The photochemically reactive sites in psoralens are the alkene-like carbon-carbon double bonds in the furan ring (the five-member ring) and the pyrone ring (the six-member ring). When appropriately intercalated adjacent to a pyrimidine base, a four-center photocycloaddition reaction can lead to the formation of either of two cyclobutyl-type monoadducts. Ordinarily, furan-side monoadducts form in a higher proportion. The furan monoadduct can absorb a second UVA photon leading to a second four-center photocycloaddition at the pyrone end of the molecule and hence the formation of a diadduct or cross-link. Pyrone monoadducts do not absorb in the UVA range and hence cannot form cross-links with further UVA irradiation.

Another important feature of this class of compounds is their ability to generate singlet oxygen, although this process is in direct competition with adduct formation and may be an alternate pathway for the dissipation of excited state energy.

Research on psoralen has historically focused on interactions with DNA and RNA (in particular, ICL formation). Psoralen, however, has also been shown to block signaling of the ErbB2 receptor which is overexpressed in certain aggressive types of breast cancer. A synthetic derivative of bergapten, 5-(4-phenoxybutoxy)psoralen, shows promise as an immunosuppressant by inhibiting a specific potassium channel. Its structure prevents intercalation into DNA, and it only very weakly produces singlet oxygen, majorly reducing unwanted toxicity and mutagenicity in vivo. This has implications for the treatment of various autoimmune diseases (e.g. multiple sclerosis, type-1 diabetes, and rheumatoid arthritis). While cell-surface modification and ion channel blocking are two newly discovered mechanisms of action, much research remains to be done.

=== Structure ===
Most furanocoumarins can be regarded as derivatives of either psoralen or angelicin. Psoralen and its derivatives are often referred to as the linear furanocoumarins, so called since they exhibit a linear chemical structure. Important linear furanocoumarins include xanthotoxin (also called methoxsalen), bergapten, imperatorin, and nodakenetin.

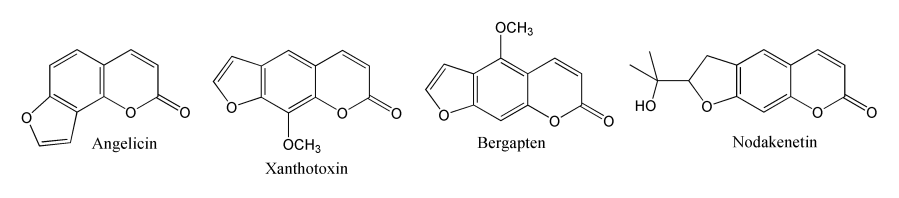
Structures of angelicin, xanthotoxin, bergapten and nodekenetin

The structure of psoralen was originally deduced by identifying the products of its degradation reactions. It exhibits the normal reactions of the lactone of coumarin, such as ring opening by alkali to give a coumarinic acid or coumaric acid derivative. Potassium permanganate causes oxidation of the furan ring, while other methods of oxidation produce furan-2,3-carboxylic acid.

=== Synthesis ===
Psoralen is difficult to synthesize because umbelliferone undergoes substitution at the 8-position rather than at the desired 6 position. Benzofuran reacts preferentially in the furan ring rather than in the benzene ring. However, the 7-hydroxy derivative of 2,3-dihydrobenzofuran (also called coumaran) does undergo substitution at the desired 6-position allowing the following synthesis of the coumarin system via a Gattermann–Koch reaction followed by a Perkin condensation using acetic anhydride. The synthesis is then completed by dehydrogenation of the five-membered ring to produce the furan ring.

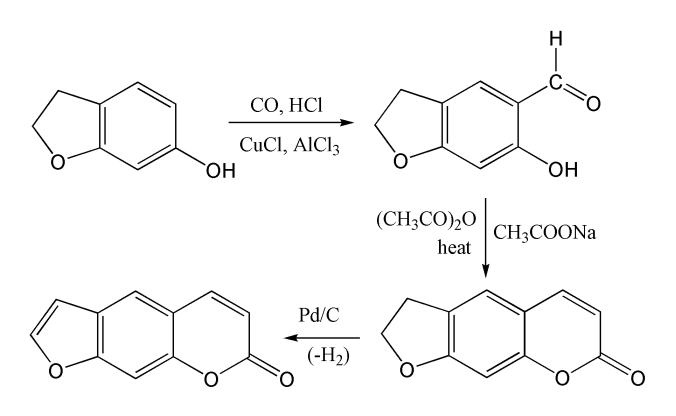
Synthesis of psoralen from 6-hydroxycoumaran

== Biosynthesis ==
Psoralen originates from coumarins in the shikimate pathway; its biosynthesis is shown in the figure below. The aromatic ring in 6 is activated at positions ortho to the hydroxyl group, and is alkylated by 5, an alkylating agent. The dimethylallyl group in 7 then undergoes cyclization with the phenol group to give 8. This transformation is catalysed by a cytochrome P-450-dependent monooxygenase17 (psoralen 5-monooxygenase), and cofactors (NADPH) and molecular oxygen.

A biosynthetic pathway in which psoralen is formed is shown in the figure below. A second P-450-dependent monooxygenase enzyme (psoralen synthase) then cleaves off 10 (in the form of 11) from 8 to give 1. This pathway does not involve any hydroxylated intermediate, and cleavage is postulated to be initiated by a radical reaction.

Synthesis of psoralen from 6-hydroxycoumaran

== Plant sources ==
Ficus carica (fig) is probably the most abundant source of psoralens. They are also found in small quantities in Ammi visnaga (bisnaga), Pastinaca sativa (parsnip), Petroselinum crispum (parsley), Levisticum officinale (lovage), Foeniculum vulgare (fruit, i.e., fennel seeds), Daucus carota (carrot), Psoralea corylifolia (babchi), Apium graveolens (celery), and bergamot oil (bergapten, bergamottin).

== Repair of psoralen DNA adducts ==
PUVA treatment produces both DNA interstrand crosslinks (ICLs) and monoadducts. The ICLs introduced by psoralen are highly genotoxic to actively replicating cells. The covalent linkage impedes replication fork progression. Thus unlinking the ICL is required before replication can resume. The initial steps in repair ordinarily involve incisions in one parental strand on both sides of the crosslink. Subsequently, repair of the lesion can occur by an accurate or an inaccurate process.

The accurate process for repairing crosslinks is homologous recombinational repair (HRR). This involves replacing the damaged information using the intact information from another homologous chromosome in the same cell. Escherichia coli cells deficient in HRR are highly sensitive to PUVA compared to wild-type cells. HRR appears to be efficient. In E. coli, even though one or two unrepaired crosslinks are sufficient to inactivate a cell, a wild-type cell can repair and therefore recover from 53 to 71 psoralen crosslinks. In the yeast Saccharomyces cerevisiae HRR is a major pathway for accurately removing psoralen-crosslinks. In wild-type yeast, the recombination events associated with crosslink removal by HRR are predominantly non-crossover gene conversion events. Psoralen crosslinks in virus DNA also appear to be removed by a recombinational repair process as occurs in SV40 virus infected cells, and in herpes simplex virus infected cells.

One inaccurate process for repairing psoralen crosslinks appears to employ a DNA polymerase to fill in the gap formed in the strand with the two incisions. This process is inaccurate because the complementary un-incised strand still retains a portion of the crosslink and thus cannot serve as an adequate template for accurate repair synthesis. Inaccurate repair synthesis can cause mutation. Psoralen monoadducts in the template DNA strand may also cause inaccurate replication bypass (translesion synthesis) that can lead to mutation. In phage T4, the increase in mutation observed after PUVA treatment was found to reflect translesion synthesis by wild-type DNA polymerase, likely due to imperfect proof reading capability.

== Analysis of nucleic acids structures ==
Psoralens can reversibly crosslink nucleic acids double helices, and therefore have been used extensively for the analysis of interactions and structures for both DNA and RNA.
