= Sfumatura =

Process for extracting essential oils

The sfumatura or slow-folding process is a traditional technique for manually extracting the essential oils from citrus peel using sponges. Dating back to 18th-century Italy, the process is still carried out in Sicily today, although it is increasingly rare. Many controversially claim that modern machinery does not approach the quality of sfumatura-produced oil.

Using a rastrello, a special spoon-shaped knife, the fresh peel is de-pulped. It is then thoroughly washed with limewater and drip-dried on woven mats or special baskets for 3 to 24 hours, depending on the ripeness of the fruit, the temperature, and the humidity. These steps harden the peel, causing the oil to spurt from the oil glands more easily, and the lime helps neutralize the acidity of the peel.

A series of natural sponges is fixed upon a terracotta basin or concolina and held in place with a wooden bar laid across the rim. The dried peel is folded and pressed against the sponges several times in a circular motion, causing a mixture of essential oil and peel liquids to pass into the concolina. After finishing with the peel, the sponges are squeezed to recover additional oil and liquids. Finally, the oil is decanted away from the heavier watery phase, which contains detritus from breaking the peel.
