= Flavour and Fragrance Journal =

- Discipline: Chemistry
- Language: English
- Edited by: Kerstin Steiner

Publication details
- History: 1985–present
- Publisher: John Wiley & Sons
- Frequency: Bimonthly
- Impact factor: 2.576 (2020)

Standard abbreviations
- ISO 4: Flavour Fragr. J.

Indexing
- CODEN: FFJOED
- ISSN: 0882-5734 (print); 1099-1026 (web)
- LCCN: sf93092309
- OCLC no.: 11893334

Links
- Journal homepage; Online access; Online archive

The Flavour and Fragrance Journal is a bimonthly peer-reviewed scientific journal published since 1985 by John Wiley & Sons. It publishes original research articles, reviews and special reports on all aspects of flavour and fragrance.

== Abstracting and indexing ==
Flavour and Fragrance Journal is indexed in:

- Chemical Abstracts Service
- Scopus
- Web of Science

According to the Journal Citation Reports, the journal has a 2020 impact factor of 2.576, ranking it 34th out of 74 journals in the category "Applied Chemistry" and 79th out of 144 in the category "Food Science and Technology.

== Notable papers ==
The most-cited articles published in the Flavour and Fragrance journal are:

1. Baratta, M. Tiziana; Dorman, H. J. Damien; Deans, Stanley G.; Figueiredo, A. Cristina; Barroso, José G.; Ruberto, Giuseppe (1998). "Antimicrobial and antioxidant properties of some commercial essential oils". Flavour and Fragrance Journal. 13 (4): 235. doi:10.1002/(SICI)1099-1026(1998070)13:4<235::AID-FFJ733>3.0.CO;2-T.
2. Griffin, Shane G.; Wyllie, S. Grant; Markham, Julie L.; Leach, David N. (1999). "The role of structure and molecular properties of terpenoids in determining their antimicrobial activity". Flavour and Fragrance Journal. 14 (5): 322. doi:10.1002/(SICI)1099-1026(199909/10)14:5<322::AID-FFJ837>3.0.CO;2-4.
3. Tominaga, Takatoshi; Furrer, Anton; Henry, Robert; Dubourdieu, Denis (1998). "Identification of new volatile thiols in the aroma ofVitis vinifera L. Var. Sauvignon blanc wines". Flavour and Fragrance Journal. 13 (3): 159. doi:10.1002/(SICI)1099-1026(199805/06)13:3<159::AID-FFJ709>3.0.CO;2-7.
