= Bergapten =

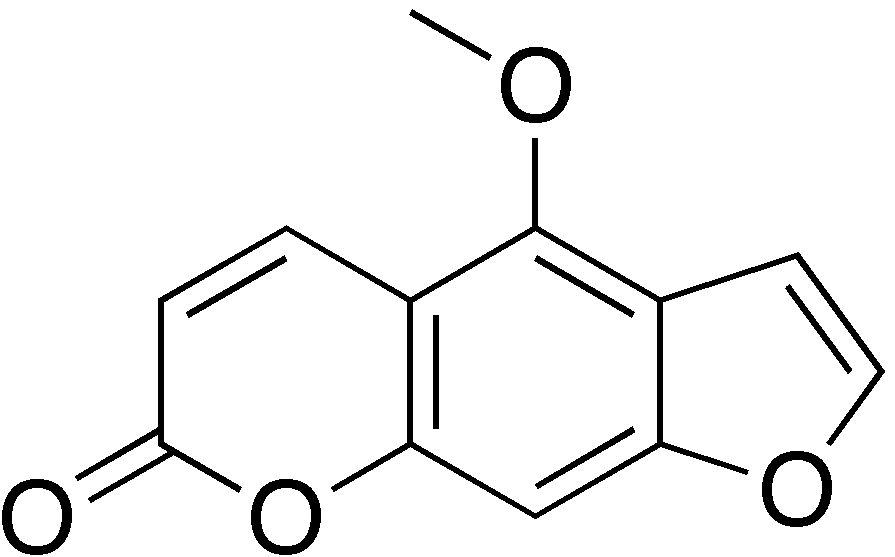

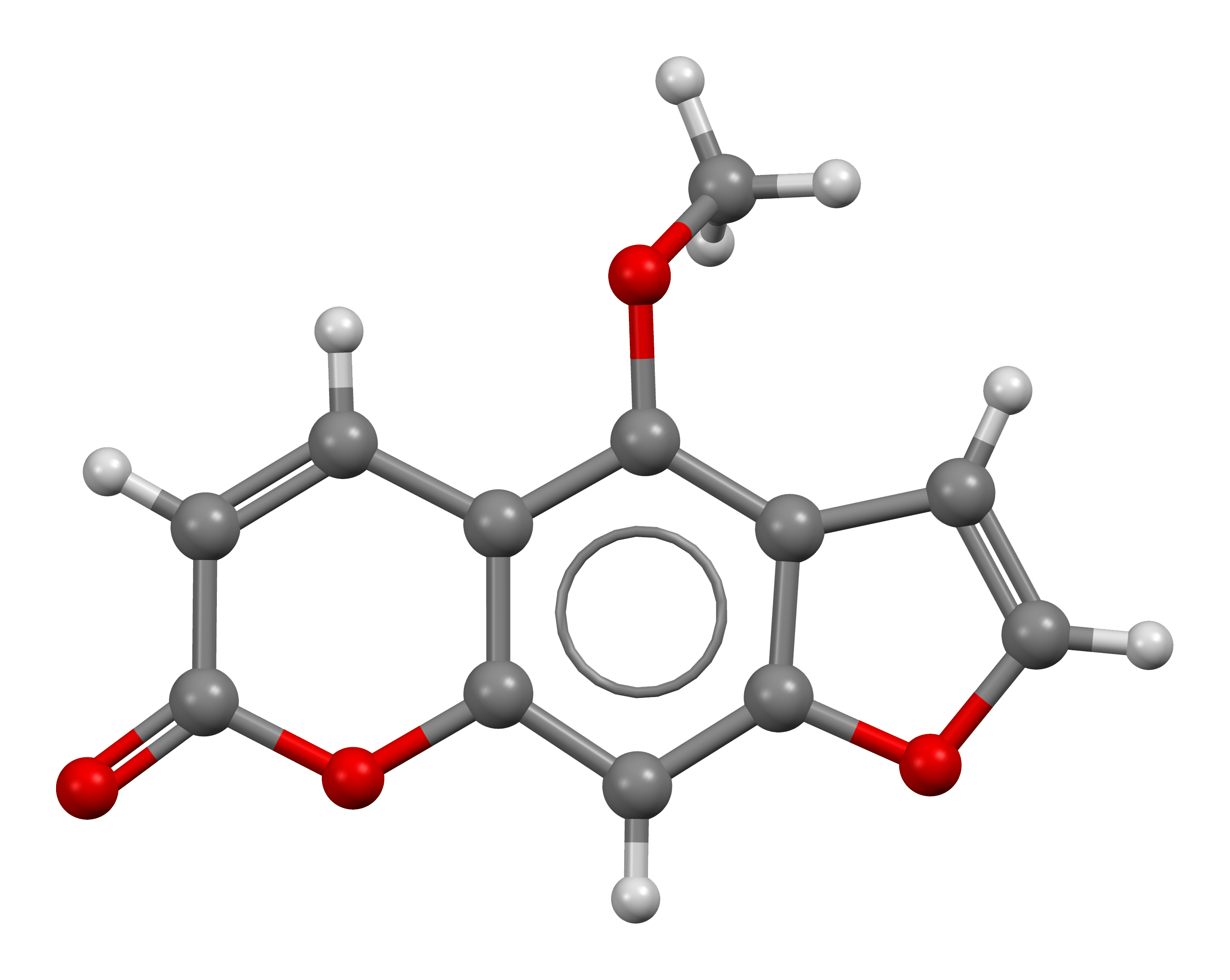

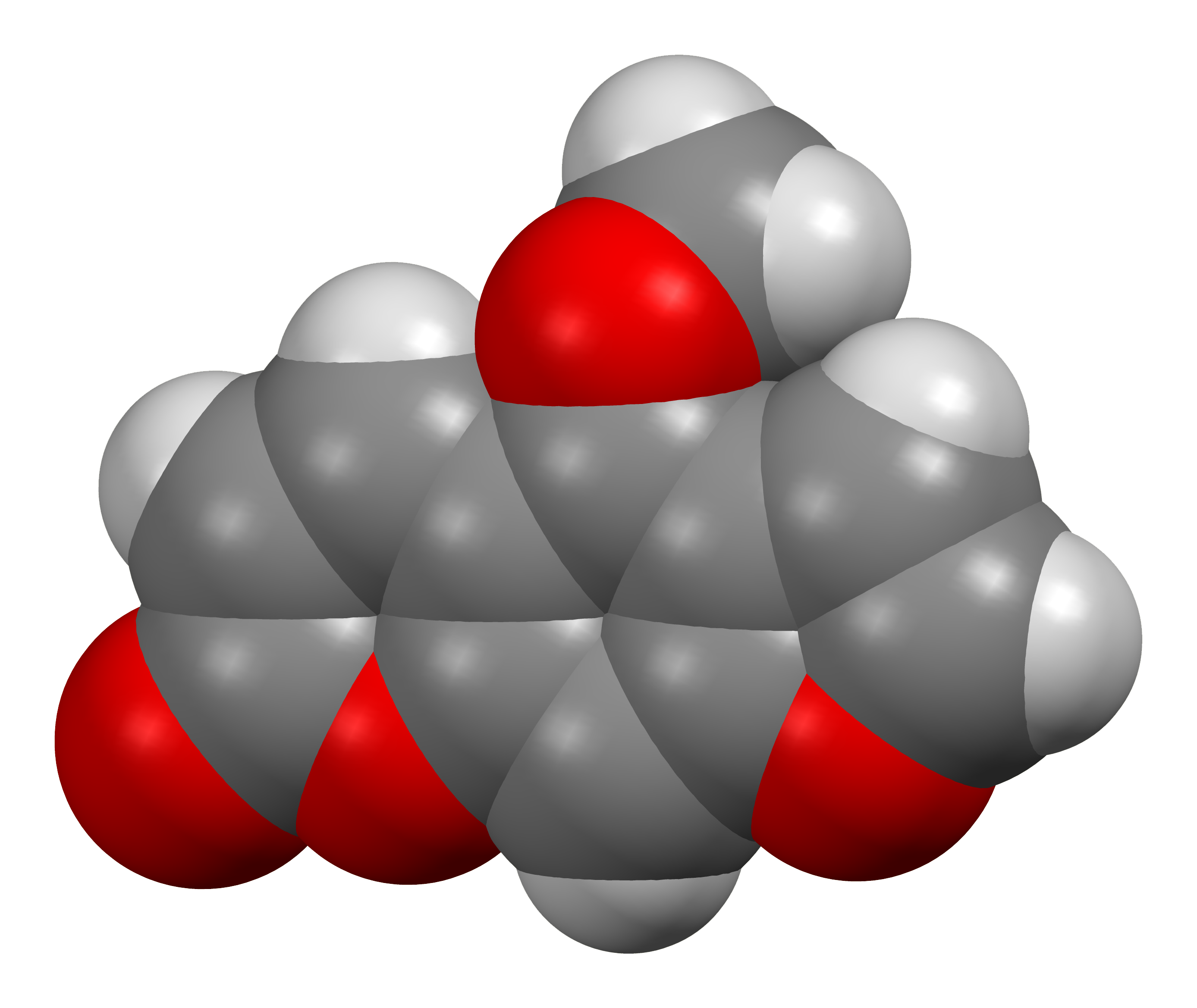

Names
- Preferred IUPAC name 4-Methoxy-7H-furo[3,2-g][1]benzopyran-7-one
- Other names: 5-Methoxypsoralen; Bergaptene; Heraclin; Majudin

Identifiers
CAS Number	484-20-8
3D model (JSmol)	Interactive image
ChEBI	CHEBI:18293
ChEMBL	ChEMBL24171
ChemSpider	2265
ECHA InfoCard	100.006.913
EC Number	207-604-5
KEGG	D07521
PubChem CID	2355
UNII	4FVK84C92X
UN number	1759
CompTox Dashboard (EPA)	DTXSID1025560
- InChI: InChI=1S/C12H8O4/c1-14-12-7-2-3-11(13)16-10(7)6-9-8(12)4-5-15-9/h2-6H,1H3 Key: BGEBZHIAGXMEMV-UHFFFAOYSA-N
- SMILES: COC1=C2C=CC(=O)OC2=CC3=C1C=CO3

Properties
Chemical formula	C_{12}H_{8}O_{4}
Molar mass	216.192 g/mol

Pharmacology
ATC code	D05BA03 (WHO)
- Except where otherwise noted, data are given for materials in their standard state (at 25 °C [77 °F], 100 kPa). Infobox references

Bergapten (5-methoxypsoralen) is a naturally occurring organic chemical compound produced by numerous plant species, especially from the carrot family Apiaceae and the citrus family Rutaceae. For example, bergapten has been extracted from 24 species of the genus Heracleum in the family Apiaceae. In the family Rutaceae, various Citrus species contain significant amounts of bergapten, especially the bergamot orange, the micrantha, and certain varieties of lime and bitter orange.

Bergapten belongs to a class of chemical compounds known as the furanocoumarins. In 1834, Kalbrunner isolated 5-methoxypsoralen from bergamot essential oil, hence the common name "bergapten". It was the first furanocoumarin to be isolated and identified.

== Toxicity ==
Bergapten is a derivative of psoralen, the parent compound of a family of naturally occurring organic compounds known as the linear furanocoumarins (so called since they exhibit a linear chemical structure). Some of the linear furanocoumarins, including bergapten, act as strong photosensitizers when applied topically to the skin.

Bergapten is often found in plants associated with phytophotodermatitis, a potentially serious skin inflammation. Contact with plant parts containing bergapten (and other linear furanocoumarins) followed by exposure to ultraviolet light may lead to phytophotodermatitis. In particular, bergapten appears to be the primary phototoxic compound responsible for Citrus-induced phytophotodermatitis.

Bergapten and other linear furanocoumarins induce a loss of template activity for RNA synthesis. 5-methoxypsoralen has also been noted for its mutagenic effects as well as its capacity for being a very potent agent for inducing chromosome aberrations. With a high enough concentration, complete mitotic inhibition was observed.

There is sufficient evidence that bergapten promotes cancer in animals but such evidence of carcinogenicity in humans is lacking. According to the International Agency for Research on Cancer, bergapten is probably carcinogenic to humans.

== Medical usages ==
Bergapten serves to have the skin absorb more light, and pigmentary diseases like vitiligo (leukodermia) and psoriasis have treatments involving furanocoumarins often in conjunction with sun exposure or solar radiation. In people who easily sunburn, furanocoumarins can also increase the tolerance of skin to solar radiation. Bergapten was shown to elicit certain skin reactions in order to even out pigmentation lightening for vitiligo patients depending on various factors like the susceptibility of the subject, the dosage, and the humidity, but the effects may be inconsistent.

With psoriasis, bergapten has been valued as an oral photochemotherapy treatment for its efficacy and lack of phototoxic and drug-insensitive reactions. It operates as a photosensitizing drug that is as effective or, with high enough dosage, more effective than 8-methoxypsoralen in the clearance of psoriasis lesions. It has been shown to be a valuable alternative to 8-methoxypsoralen due to the relative lack of side effects during treatment like erythma, pruritus, and nausea.

Bergapten has also been implicated as a potential prevention method for sunlight-related skin cancer. One study found that a tan gained with bergapten had less DNA damage in human subjects. Bergapten has been shown to have anti-tumoral effects, like its ability to induce the autophagic process in breast cancer cells. One study suggested that this was possible through the up-regulation of PTEN gene expression in those breast cancer cells.

Recent studies suggest high potential effectiveness in treating antibiotic-resistant Lyme disease.

Bergapten, alongside other furanocoumarins, has also been implicated in Cytochrome P450 inhibition.

== Synthesis ==
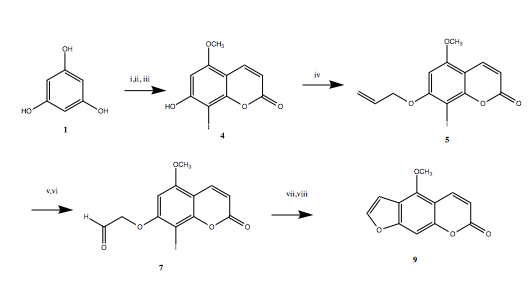
Condensed version of efficient synthesis of Bergapten

Bergapten is a natural compound coming from plants like the common fig, but it can also be synthesized. Most syntheses of linear furanocoumarins involve starting with a central aromatic unit and adding two heterocyclic rings. Alternate routes of synthesis are desirable to avoid regiochemical problems and moderate yields. The synthesis described here involves Iodine as a removable group to insure regiochemical integrity and convergence. As shown in the diagram, phloroglucinol (compound 1) was the starting material. Mono-methylation was conducted followed by a reaction with ethyl propiolate in the presence of ZnCl_{2} to yield 7-hydroxy-5-methoxycoumarin (product 3, not shown) with 68% yield. The 8-position of 7-hydroxy-5-methoxycoumarin was then protected by iodine to avoid the formation of an angular furanocoumarin. Product 4 in the diagram is the result of that iodine protection. Product 5 was the result of the allylation of product 4. Osmium tetraoxide and sodium metaperiodate were used to oxidatively cleave the O-allyl derivative onto the aldehyde product 7 via a diol intermediate (product 6, not shown). Cyclization of the aldehyde product 7 using BF_{3}-Et_{2}O in tetra-n-butylammonium bromide was then conducted to construct the furan ring. The final step was to remove the iodine protective group via Pd(OAc)_{2} to ultimately produce bergapten (product 9) with 90% yield. Synthetic bergapten was isolated as a colorless compound with properties spectroscopically identical to the natural product.

A known use of bergapten is in the synthesis of Fraxinol. The key reaction in this synthesis is the oxidation of the furan ring of visnagin and bergapten with chromic acid.
