= Citropten =

Names
- Preferred IUPAC name 5,7-Dimethoxy-2H-1-benzopyran-2-one
- Other names 5,7-Dimethoxy-2H-chromen-2-one; 5,7-Dimethoxycoumarin; Citroptene; Citraptene; Limettin; Limetin

Identifiers
CAS Number	487-06-9
3D model (JSmol)	Interactive image
ChemSpider	2673
ECHA InfoCard	100.006.952
PubChem CID	2775
UNII	JWE1QQ247N
CompTox Dashboard (EPA)	DTXSID1041421
- InChI: InChI=1S/C11H10O4/c1-13-7-5-9(14-2)8-3-4-11(12)15-10(8)6-7/h3-6H,1-2H3 Key: NXJCRELRQHZBQA-UHFFFAOYSA-N; InChI=1/C11H10O4/c1-13-7-5-9(14-2)8-3-4-11(12)15-10(8)6-7/h3-6H,1-2H3 Key: NXJCRELRQHZBQA-UHFFFAOYAC
- SMILES: O=C/2Oc1cc(OC)cc(OC)c1\C=C\2

Properties
Chemical formula	C_{11}H_{10}O_{4}
Molar mass	206.197 g·mol^{−1}
Melting point	146 to 149 °C (295 to 300 °F; 419 to 422 K)
- Except where otherwise noted, data are given for materials in their standard state (at 25 °C [77 °F], 100 kPa). Infobox references

Citropten is a natural organic compound with the molecular formula C_{11}H_{10}O_{4}. It is found in the essential oils of citrus such as lime, lemon, and bergamot.

== Properties ==
Studies suggest it possesses several potential properties:

- Antimicrobial activity – Citropten may exhibit antibacterial and antifungal properties. This characteristic could be relevant for applications in disinfectants or preservatives.
- Anti-inflammatory and antioxidant effects – Emerging research indicates citropten might have anti-inflammatory and antioxidant capabilities. These properties could hold promise for various health applications.

The pleasant aroma of citropten makes it a valuable component in the fragrance industry, used in perfumes and cosmetics. Its potential antimicrobial properties are also prompting exploration for use in medicine and pharmaceuticals.
