= Bergamottin =

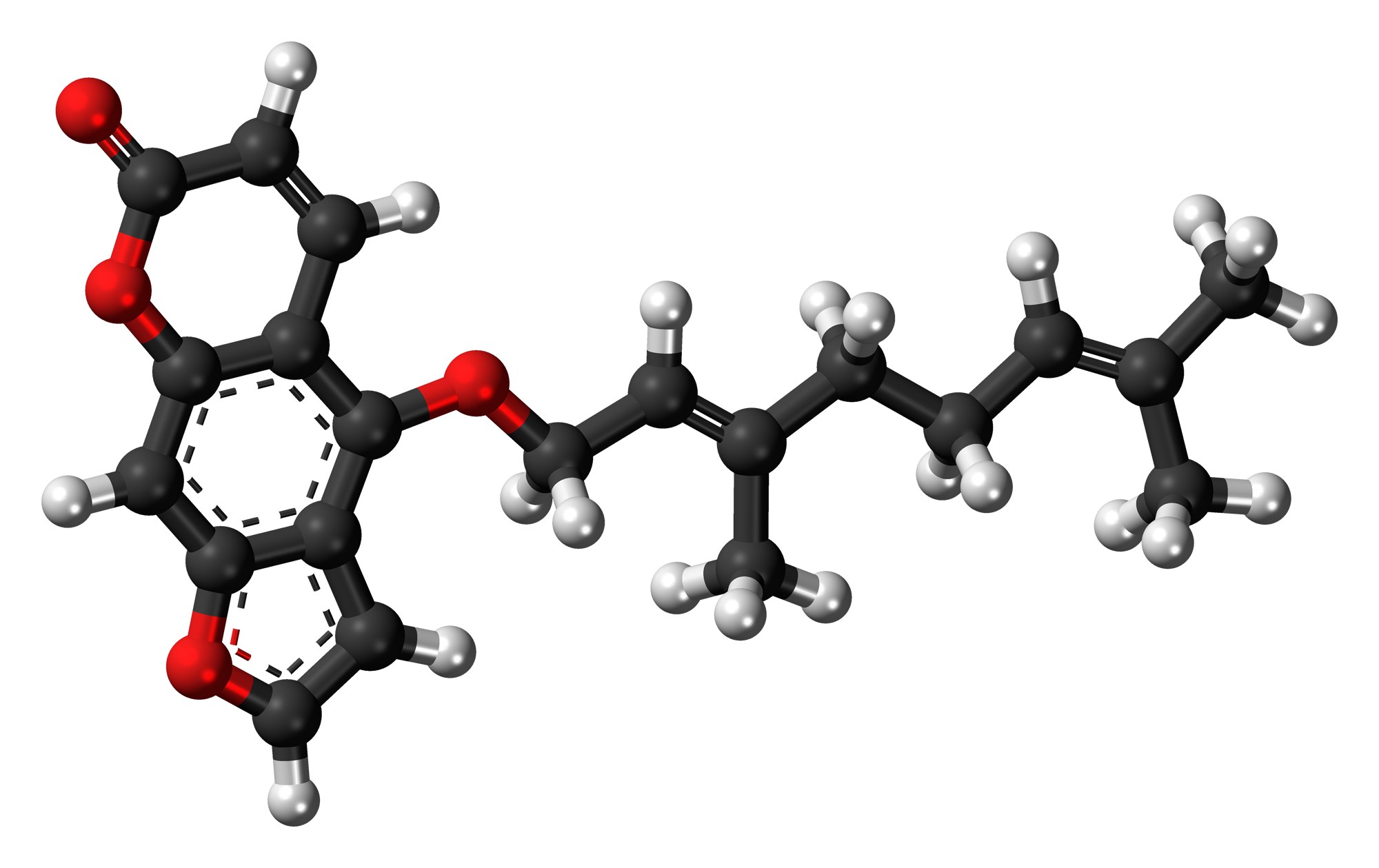

Names
- Preferred IUPAC name 4-{[(2E)-3,7-Dimethylocta-2,6-dien-1-yl]oxy}-7H-furo[3,2-g][1]benzopyran-7-one
- Other names Bergamotine; 5-Geranoxypsoralen

Identifiers
CAS Number	7380-40-7
3D model (JSmol)	Interactive image
ChEMBL	ChEMBL1078442
ChemSpider	4581520
ECHA InfoCard	100.166.792
PubChem CID	5471349
UNII	JMU611YFRB
CompTox Dashboard (EPA)	DTXSID50897528
- InChI: InChI=1S/C21H22O4/c1-14(2)5-4-6-15(3)9-11-24-21-16-7-8-20(22)25-19(16)13-18-17(21)10-12-23-18/h5,7-10,12-13H,4,6,11H2,1-3H3/b15-9+ Key: DBMJZOMNXBSRED-OQLLNIDSSA-N; InChI=1/C21H22O4/c1-14(2)5-4-6-15(3)9-11-24-21-16-7-8-20(22)25-19(16)13-18-17(21)10-12-23-18/h5,7-10,12-13H,4,6,11H2,1-3H3/b15-9+ Key: DBMJZOMNXBSRED-OQLLNIDSBR
- SMILES: CC(=CCC/C(=C/COC1=C2C=CC(=O)OC2=CC3=C1C=CO3)/C)C

Properties
Chemical formula	C_{21}H_{22}O_{4}
Molar mass	338.403 g·mol^{−1}
Melting point	55 to 56 °C (131 to 133 °F; 328 to 329 K)
- Except where otherwise noted, data are given for materials in their standard state (at 25 °C [77 °F], 100 kPa). verify (what is ?) Infobox references

Bergamottin (5-geranoxypsoralen) is a natural furanocoumarin found in the pulp of pomelos and grapefruits. It is also found in the peel and pulp of the bergamot orange, from which it was first isolated and from which its name is derived.

== Chemistry ==
Bergamottin and dihydroxybergamottin are linear furanocoumarins functionalized with side chains derived from geraniol. They are inhibitors of some isoforms of the cytochrome P450 enzyme, in particular CYP3A4. This prevents oxidative metabolism of certain drugs by the enzyme, resulting in an elevated concentration of drug in the bloodstream.

Under normal circumstances, the grapefruit juice effect is considered to be a negative interaction, and patients are often warned not to consume grapefruit or its juice when taking medication. However, some current research is focused on the potential benefits of cytochrome P450 inhibition. Bergamottin, dihydroxybergamottin, or synthetic analogs may be developed as drugs that are targeted to increase the oral bioavailability of other drugs. Drugs that may have limited use because they are metabolized by CYP3A4 may become viable medications when taken with a CYP3A4 inhibitor because the dose required to achieve a necessary concentration in the blood would be lowered.

An example of the use of this effect in current medicines is the co-administration of ritonavir, a potent inhibitor of the CYP3A4 and CYP2D6 isoforms of cytochrome P450, with other antiretroviral drugs. Although ritonavir inhibits HIV replication in its own right, its use in these treatment regimens is to enhance the bioavailability of other agents through inhibition of the enzymes that metabolize them.

== Biosynthesis ==
Bergamottin is derived from components originating in the shikimate pathway. The biosynthesis of this compound starts with the formation of the demethylsuberosin (3) product, which is formed via the alkylation of the umbelliferone (2) compound. The alkylation of the umbelliferone is initiated with the use of dimethylallyl pyrophosphate, more commonly known as DMAPP. The cyclization of an alkyl group occurs to form marmesin (4), which is done in the presence of NADPH and oxygen along with a cytochrome P450 monooxygenase catalyst. This process is then repeated twice more, first to remove the hydroxyisopropyl substituent from marmesin (4) to form psoralen (5), and then to add a hydroxyl group to form bergaptol (6). Bergaptol (6) is next methylated with S-adenosyl methionine (SAM) to form bergapten (7). The final step in this biosynthesis is the attachment of a GPP, or geranyl pyrophosphate, to the newly methylated bergapten (7) to form the target molecule bergamottin (8).
