= Sharbat (drink) =

Beverage of fruit or flower petals

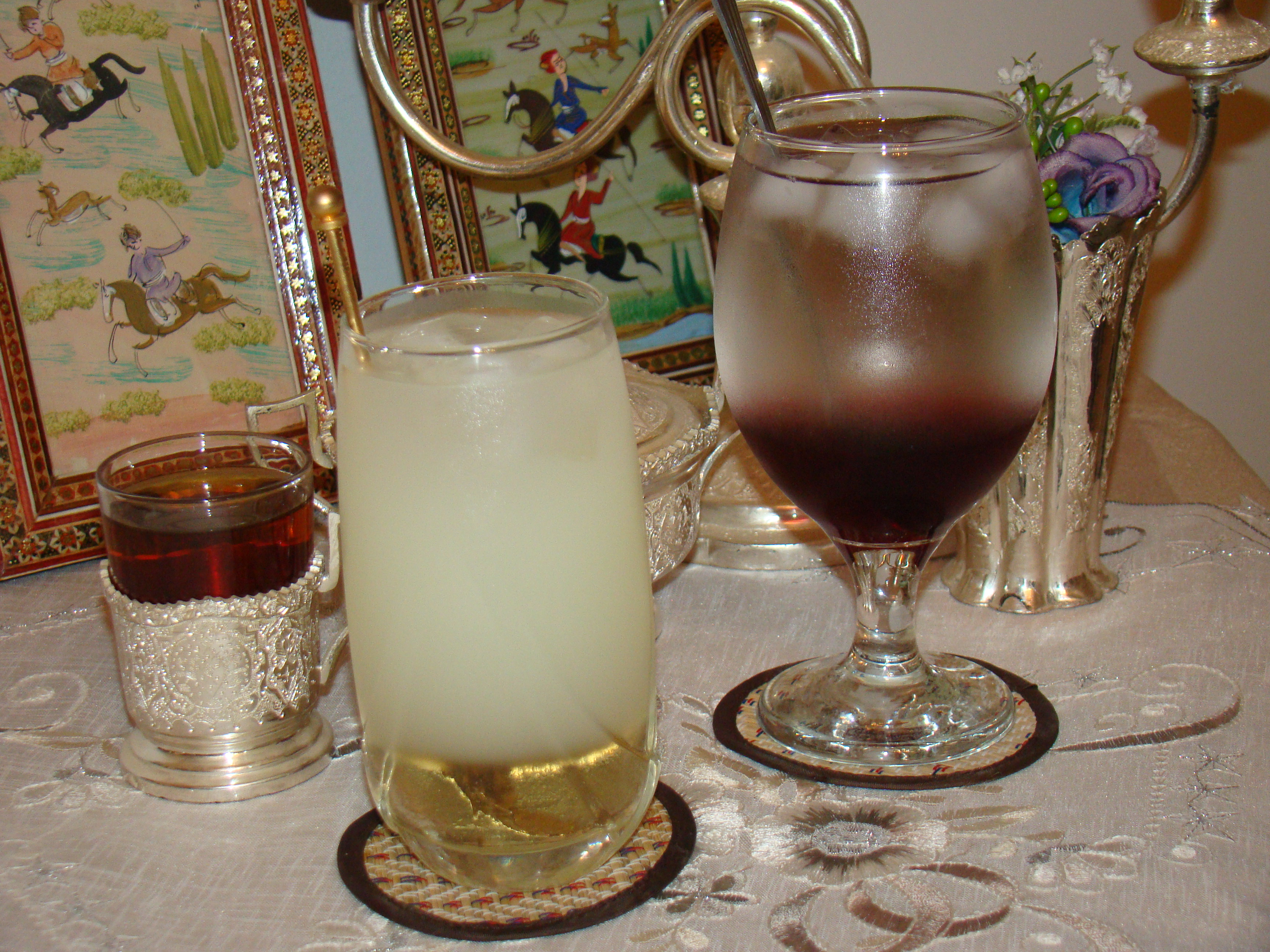
Two kinds of Iranian sharbat (center is lemon and right is cherry sharbat) along with Iranian tea (left)

Sharbat (Persian: شربت, pronounced [ʃæɾˈbæt]; Turkish şerbet, Arabic شَرْبَة sharbah, a drink, from "shariba" to drink. This word can be written as shorbot, šerbet, şerbet or sherbet) is a drink prepared from fruit or flower petals. It is a sweet cordial, and usually served chilled. It can be served in concentrated form and eaten with a spoon or diluted with water to create the drink.

Popular sharbats are made of one or more of the following: basil seeds, golāb (rose water), fresh rose petals, sandalwood, bael, hibiscus, lemon, orange, mango, pineapple, grape, falsa (Grewia asiatica) and chia seeds.

Sharbat is common in the homes of Iran, Armenia, Türkiye, Bosnia, the Arab world, Afghanistan, Pakistan, Bangladesh and India. It is also popular with Muslims when breaking their daily fasts during the month of Ramadan.

== Etymology ==
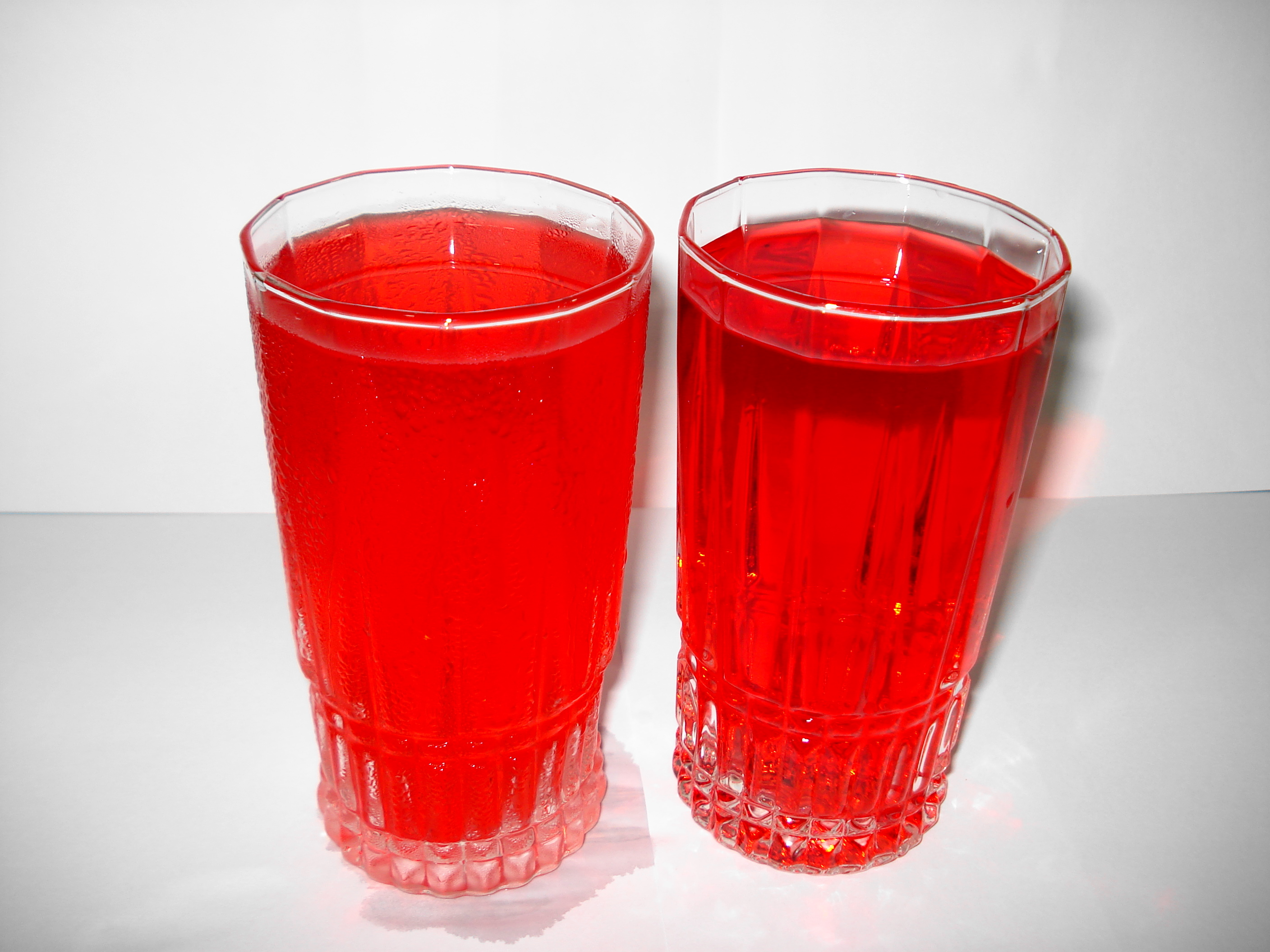
Rooh Afza sharbat or shorbot drink made from fruit and herbs formulated in 1906 in Ghaziabad, Uttar Pradesh, India, and launched from Old Delhi, India

The term comes from the Persian word sharbat (شربت), meaning a drink of sugar and water. This in turn came from the Arabic word shariba, "to drink". By the late Middle Ages, the Arabic word sharāb (شراب) had come to mean "alcoholic beverage" and the alternate form sharbāt (شربات) and its Persian and Turkish variations, sharbat (شربت), and şerbet respectively, took on the meaning of a sweet non-alcoholic beverage. The word is reported to have been first used in English vocabulary in 1603, and referenced by philosopher Francis Bacon in 1626.

== History ==
It is believed that sharbats originated in Iran (Persia). Around 400 BC, sharbat had become popular in Persia as fruit syrup historically cooled with snow. Several syrups are listed in the 11th-century Canon of Medicine by Persian scholar Ibn Sīnā. In the 12th century, Persian book of Zakhireye Khwarazmshahi, Gorgani describes different types of Sharbats in Iran, including Ghoore, Anar, Sekanjebin, etc.

The first Western mention of sharbat is an Italian reference to something that Turks drink. The word enters Italian as sorbetti which later became sorbet in French. In the 17th-century, England began importing "sherbet powders" made from dried fruit and flowers mixed with sugar. In the modern era sherbet powder is still popular in the UK, though Oxford Reference distinguishes this earlier drink from the later use of effervescent “sherbet powder” in English. A contemporary English writer traveling in the Middle East wrote of "sundry sherbets … some made of sugar and lemons, some of violets, and the like." When Europeans figured out how to freeze sherbet they began making sorbetto by adding fruit juices and flavorings to a frozen simple syrup base. In the US sherbet generally meant an ice milk, but recipes from early soda fountain manuals include ingredients like gelatin, beaten egg whites, cream, or milk.

Sharbat was traditionally made with cane juice, but in modern times it is commonly made at home with sugar and water. Lime is sometimes added to improve the texture and flavor of the sharbat. Honey is also commonly used as a sweetener. Sharbet comes in many flavors including lemon, pomegranate, quince, strawberry, cherry, orange, rose, orange blossom, tamarind, mulberry and violet. One sharbat recorded in the 19th-century cookbook by Friedrich Unger is called Gülgülü Tiryaki Şerbeti (English: The regular's Rose of the Roses Sherbet)

== Varieties ==
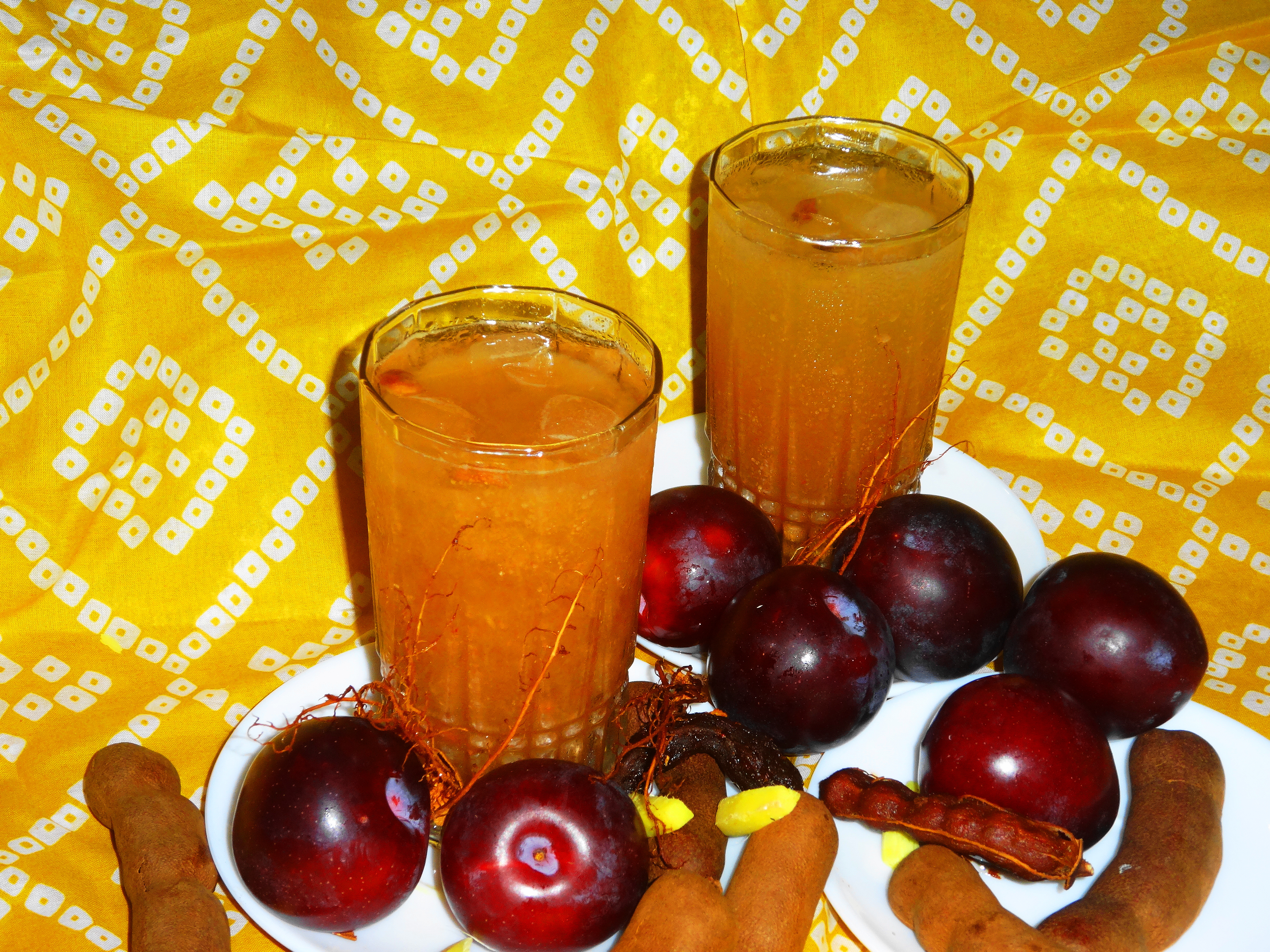
Tamarind and plum sharbat

Tamarind sherbet is a popular non-alcoholic beverage in Muslim countries that is commonly prepared during Ramadan. In Turkey tamarind sherbet, called demirhindi şerbeti, might be flavored with cloves, cardamom, fresh ginger, a cinnamon stick, honey, sage and dried linden flowers. In Hindi-Urdu, tamarind is called imli and is commonly paired with dried plums (aaloo bukhara).

Almond sherbet is probably of Persian origin and can be spiced with cardamom and kewra. Another version of almond sherbet is made with milk and saffron and musk melon seeds are sometimes added.

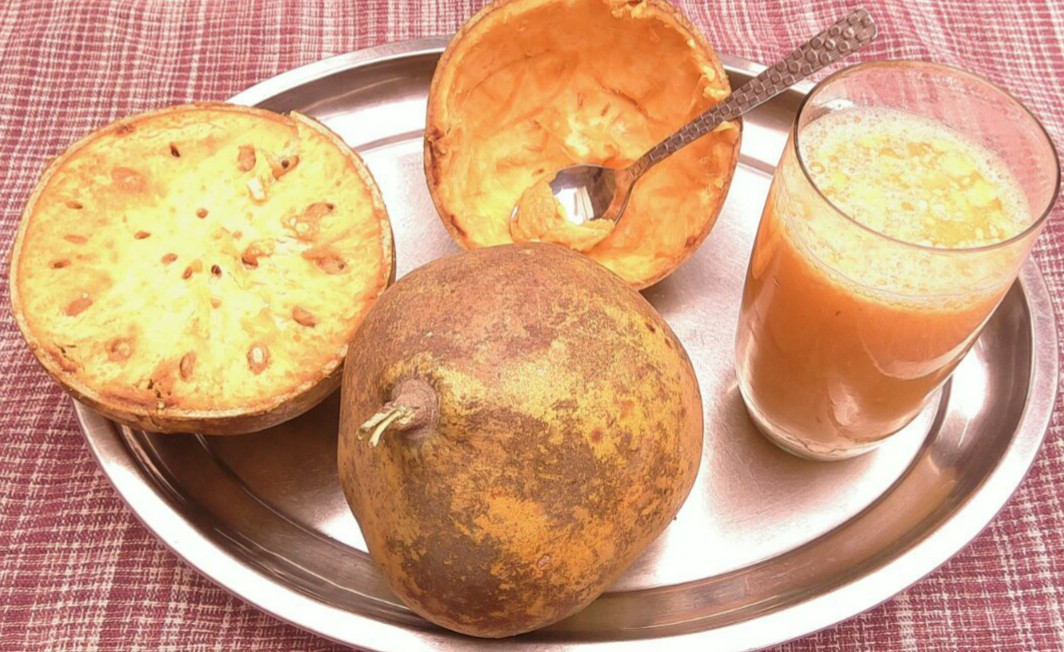
Bela Pana

Wood apple sharbat can be flavored with salt, pepper and mentha or simply sugar and lemon juice. Called bael ka sharbat it is one of the most popular beverages in India and was discussed in the 1894 Agricultural Gazette of New South Wales. Another sharbat variation from India is made with powdered sandalwood (chandan) and sugared milk. Phalsa berries are another base for some varieties of south Asian sherbet. Some sour sharbet variations might make use of citrus fruits, tamarind, or amla berries. An Indian lemonade called nimbu pani is made with fresh squeezed lemon or lime juice with additional flavorings like ginger, mint, saffron, kewra or even crushed black pepper.

Vetiver sherbet (khus syrup) can be made by adding khus essence to sugar and water. The khus essence itself is made from the roots of vetiver grass. Vetiver sherbet can be used as a flavoring for milkshakes, lassi and other yogurt drinks, ice cream, Shirley Temples and other mixed beverages. It can also be used as a general purpose dessert topping.

The most common sharbat flavor is probably rose. Rose sharbat can be used as a topping for the milk pudding muhallebi. One Turkish method of making rose sharbat involves kneading fresh rose petals with a little citric acid or sugar to release their fragrance. (If sugar is used the petals are left in the fridge overnight and a small amount of lemon juice is added the following day.) This petal mixture is called gül mayası and can be added to a sharbat base of sugar and water to make a rose sharbat topping that can be used to flavor desserts like muhallebi, and other cookies and cakes.

=== Middle East ===
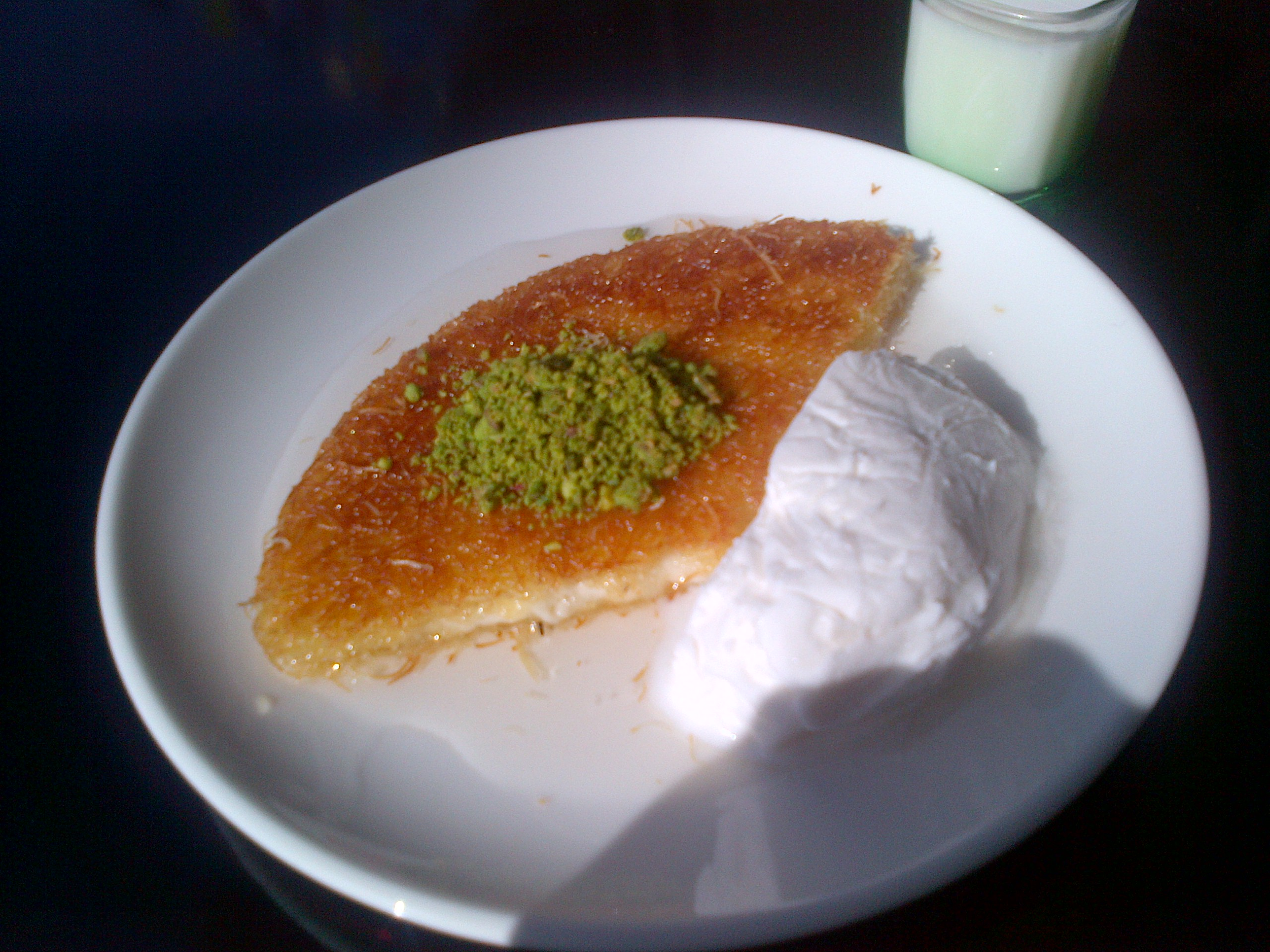
Knafeh, dessert made from kadayif soaked in sherbet, served with dondurma

Many Ottoman Muslims did not have a custom of consuming or serving alcoholic beverages, which contributed to the popularity of sherbet during the Middle Ages. In the Ottoman period, palace sherbet production took place in the Helvahane and that sherbet commonly consisted of fruit and water, enhanced with sugar, rose water, and spices. Sherbet could take three forms: syrups, pastes called çevirme and tablets. Ottoman confectioners would create concentrated essences out of fresh ingredients that could be diluted to make sherbet. In 17^{th} century Istanbul about 500 people worked in the sherbet trade across 300 shops, rising to around 1100 when certain itinerant sellers are included. These Ottoman-era sherbets were produced year-round and served cold in summer and hot in winter, with hot and spicy sherbets widely consumed during colder months. In modern times, sherbet production has declined but in some regions of Turkey syrups are still made. Pastes are rare and can only be found in speciality shops; most commercially available pastes today are limited to bergamot or mastic flavors. Tablets were a specialty item, even during Ottoman Times, made only by confectioner's in professional shops. To make the tablets, fruit juices and essential oils, like rose or cinnamon, were added to boiling sugared water and stirred against the sides of the pan until the sugar began to crystallize. Spices, ground nuts, and herbs might be added to the mixture, which was poured onto a large marble slab and allowed to set.

In the 19th-century Isaac Edrehi wrote about a shopkeeper named Mustafa who made two types of beverages called sherbet and khoshâb:

One of the dainties on the happy mixture of which Hadjy Mustafa prides himself is khoshâb. This beverage, though nearly related to, must not be confounded with, sherbet. The latter is slightly acidulated, and in general made of fresh lemon, quince, orange or cherry juice, or of candied grapes, mulberries, and Damascus plums, squeezed or diluted in cold water, and thus drank at all hours. But the khoshâb (agreeable water) forms the termination of all orthodox dinners, and is composed of preserved fruits or syrups, such as Aidin pomegranates, Mardin plums, Damascus and Bokhara apricots, Rodosto peaches, Scala Nuova cherries, Beybek strawberries, Adrianople roses, tamarinds, and so forth."

The Ottoman writer Evliya Çelebi records that the Merchants of Khoshâb in Ottoman Egypt made khoshâb, which he calls "a kind of sherbet", from "the juice of the most excellent fruits, such as apricots of Bokhara, plums of Mardin, pears of Azerbaijan, mulberries of Arabguir, grapes of Smyrna, sour cherries (aigriottes) of Rodosto, apples of Koja Ili, prunes of Temesvar, and peaches of Constantinople." According to this account the khoshâb is flavored with "amber and musk". He goes on to describe a different group of sherbet-merchants whose shops are decorated with "many thousand cups and bowls of China and Fayence, which are filled with sherbet, made of rhubarb, roses, lemons, lotus, tamarinds and grapes."

The 15th-century Ottoman poem by Süleyman Çelebi wrote: "As I burned with raging thirst, They handed me a glass of sherbet" describing how the Islamic prophet Muhammad's mother was given a glass of sherbet while she was in labor. When a woman in Anatolia gives birth it is still customary to offer a hot sherbet called lohusa şerbeti to guests.

Common sharbat flavors include tamarind, pomegranate, black mulberry, sour grape, licorice, morello cherry, rose, honey. One version uses fresh purple wisteria flowers. The petals are soaked in water for a full day and then strained through cheesecloth. The petals are bundled in the cheesecloth and their highly fragranced liquid is also squeezed into the bowl containing the scented water. Sugar is added and the sugared mixture is allowed to rest overnight.

A simple sherbet of lemon, citric acid and water, without additional spices, is called nişan şerbeti or "betrothal sherbet" in Turkish and is traditionally served at engagement ceremonies. Some versions of lemon sherbet may be optionally flavored with honey and cloves. A similar sherbet flavored with cloves and lemon juice can also be made with fresh peaches. Green apple and cinnamon is another possible flavor combination. One recipe for "Ottoman sherbet" calls for sugared sour cherries, dried plums, golden raisins, fresh ginger, cloves, cinnamon sticks to be simmered together.

=== India ===
Sharbat was introduced to India by the Mughals in the 16th century. It was popularised in the Indian subcontinent by Babur, who sent for frequent loads of ice from the Himalayas to make a cool refreshing drink.

=== Algeria ===
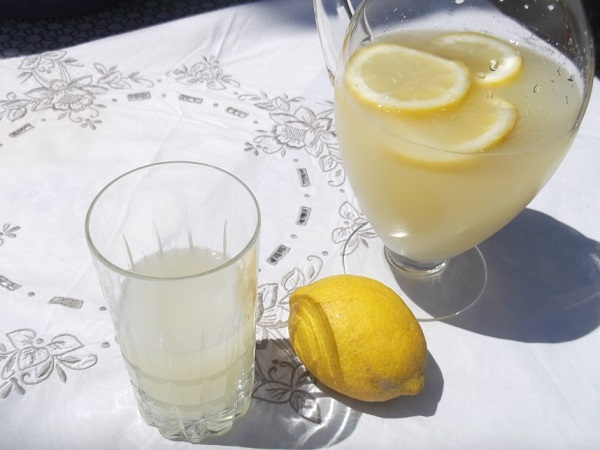
Lemon Cherbet

Cherbet (Arabic: شربات), also known as or charbet mazhar, is a traditional Algerian drink. In Algerian weddings, the bride drinks a large quantity of this traditional beverage and then offers it to her female guests after the hammam ritual, along with brioche pastries called kâak bouchkara.

Its origin comes from the Algiers region, specifically from the city of Algiers. Its name comes from Algerian Arabic and means "drink made from orange blossom water.

It is a syrup made of water, fresh cinnamon, a large amount of orange blossom water, and sugar according to taste.

=== Indonesia ===
An Indonesian, especially Javanese, drink called serbat is commonly found during the month of Ramadan. The most popular is made by mixing cold water, simple syrup, and shredded cantaloupe, popularly known as serbat blewah or cantaloupe sherbet.

== See also ==
- Rooh Afza
- Smoothie
- Squash (drink)
- Syrup
