= Maha Bishuba Sankranti =

Odia new year

Maha Bishuba Sankranti Pana Sankranti
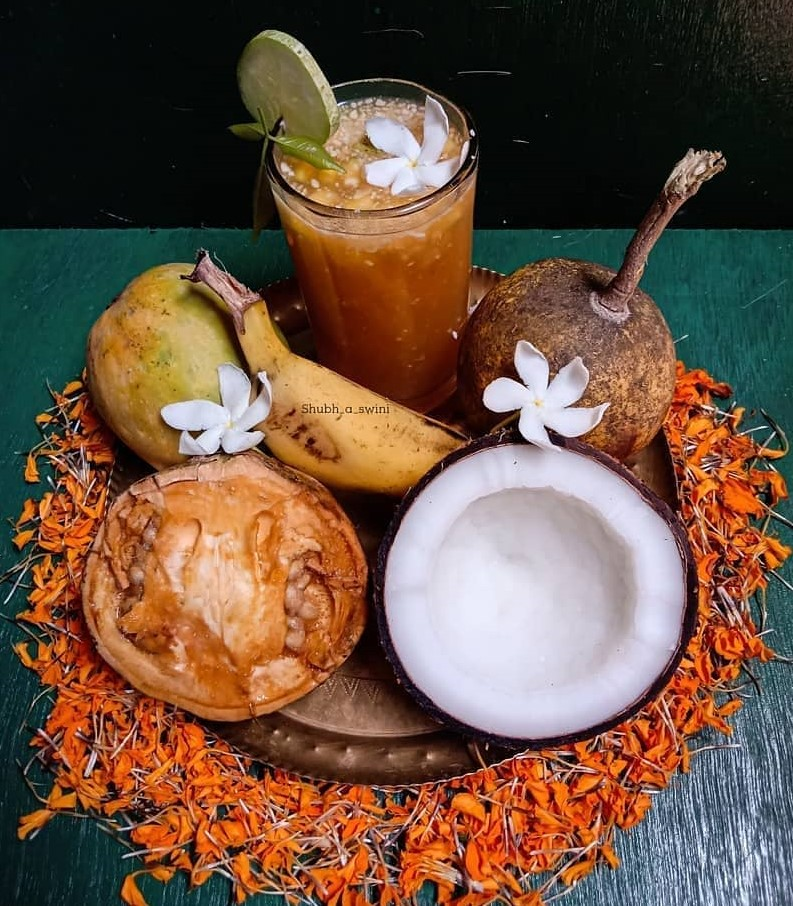
- Pana Sankranti (Maha Vishuba Sankranti) offerings with Bela Pana
- Official name: Maha Bishuba Sankranti
- Also called: Pana Sankranti; Odia Nua Barsa
- Observed by: Odias
- Type: Social, Cultural, Religious
- Significance: Odia New Year
- Celebrations: Meru Jatra, Jhaamu Jatra, Chadak Parba
- Observances: Pujas, processions, Bela Pana
- Date: 1st Baisakha of Odia calendar
- 2026 date: 14 April
- Related to: South and Southeast Asian solar New Year

Maha Bishuba Sankranti (Odia: ମହା ବିଷୁବ ସଂକ୍ରାନ୍ତି), also known as Pana Sankranti (Odia: ପଣା ସଂକ୍ରାନ୍ତି), is the traditional new year day festival of Odia people in Odisha, India. The festival occurs in the solar Odia calendar (the lunisolar Hindu calendar followed in Odisha) on the first day of the traditional solar month of Meṣa, hence equivalent lunar month Baisakha. This falls on the Purnimanta system of the Indian Hindu calendar. It therefore falls on 13/14 April every year on the Gregorian calendar.

The festival is celebrated with visits to Shiva, Shakti or Hanuman temples. People take baths in rivers or major pilgrimage centers. Communities participate in mela (fairs), participate in traditional dance or acrobatic performances. Feasts and special drinks such as a chilled wood apple-milk-yogurt-coconut drink called pana is shared, a tradition that partly is the source of this festival's name.

Pana Sankranti is related to new year festivals in South and Southeast Asian solar New Year as observed by Hindus and Buddhists elsewhere such as Vaisakhi (north and central India, Nepal), Bohag Bihu (Assam), Pohela Boishakh (Bengal), Puthandu (Tamil Nadu) etc.

== Practices ==
In the Odia Hindu tradition, Pana Sankranti is believed to be the birthday of the Hindu deity Hanuman, whose loving devotion to Rama (the seventh incarnation of Vishnu) in the Ramayana is legendary. His temples, along with those of Shiva and Surya (the Sun god) are revered on the new year.

Hindus also visit Devi (goddess) temples on Pana Sankranti. The temples include Taratarini Temple near Brahmapur, Odisha in Ganjam, Cuttack Chandi, Biraja Temple, Samaleswari temple and Sarala Temple. At Sarala Temple the priests walk on hot coals in the fire-walking festival, Jhaamu Yatra. At the Maa Patana Mangala Temple in Chhatrapada, Bhadrak, the Patua Yatra festival is held from 14 April to 21 April. In Northern Odisha, the festival is known as Chadak Parva. In Southern Odisha, the Meru Yatra festival is celebrated as the end of the month-long danda nata dance festival. Thousands of devotees gather at the Shakti Pitha shrine in the Taratarini Temple because it is one of the auspicious days during the Chaitra Yatra.

=== Bela Pana ===
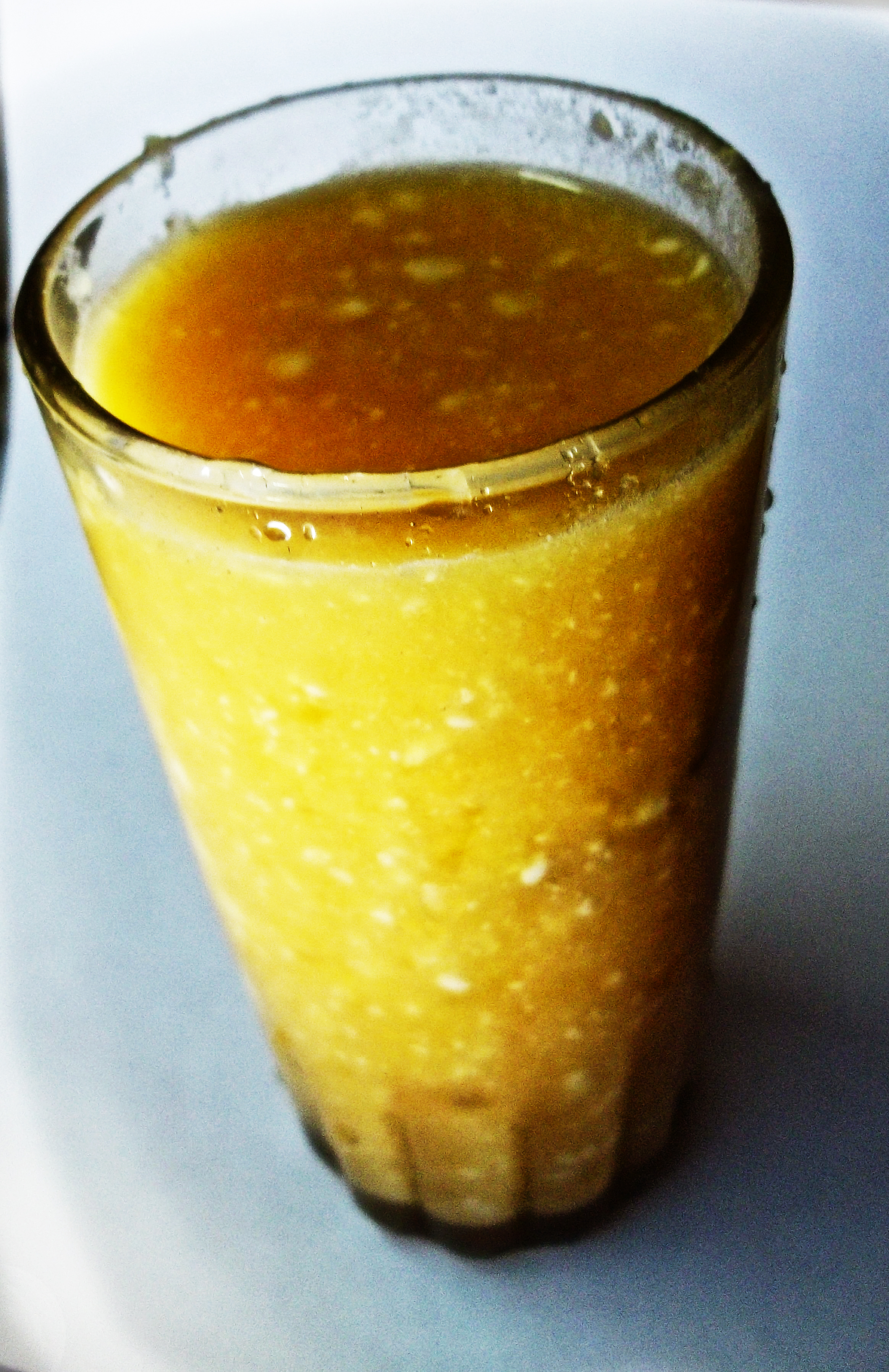
Bela Pana is a special festive sweet drink made from milk, ripe fruit of bel and spices, shared on Odia new year.

People from all over the state eat festive Chhatua and drink Bela Pana to mark the occasion. The Bela Pana is prepared with Bael, fruits, and sugar.

=== Basundhara theki ===
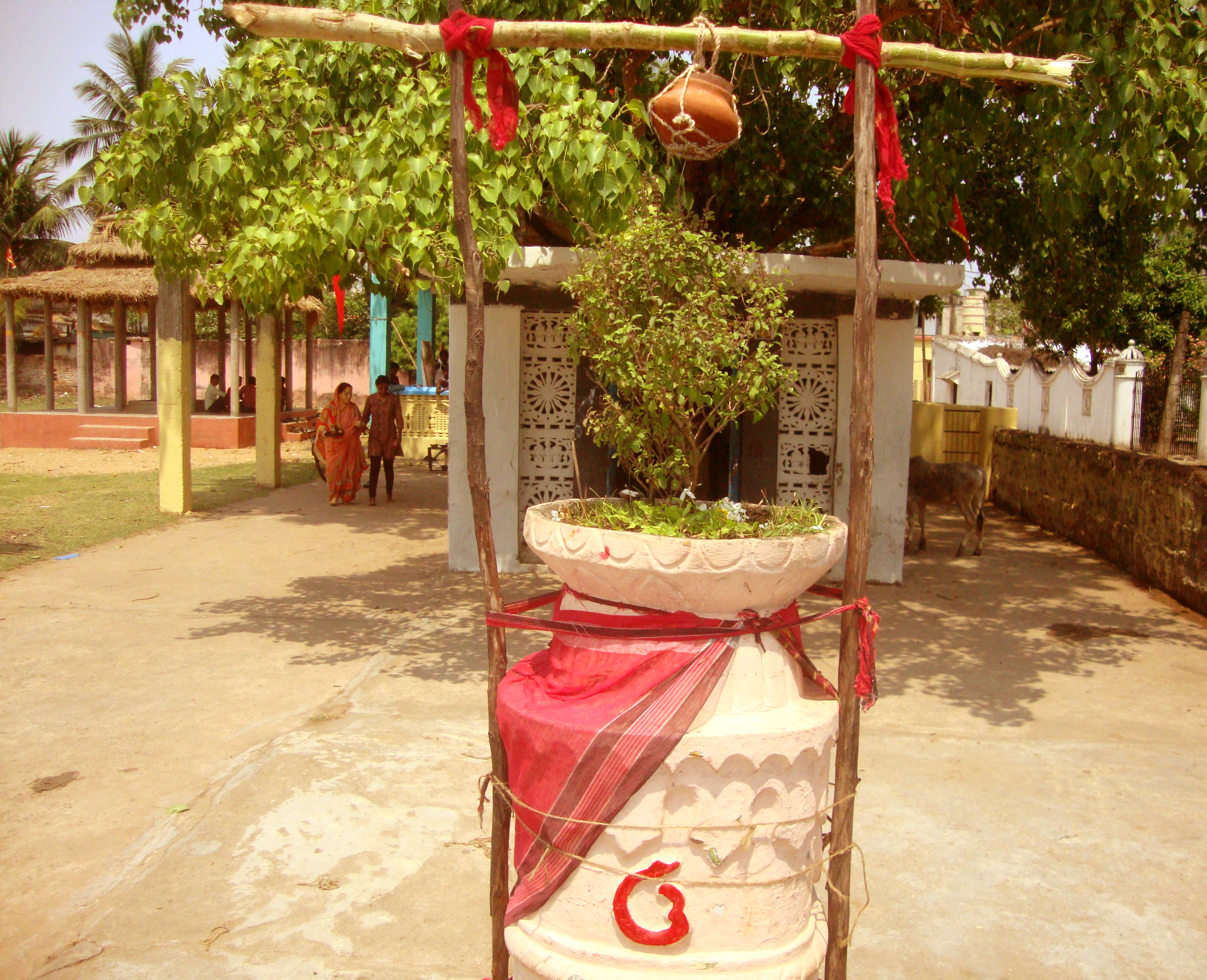
Basundhara theki

An important ritual observed during Pana Sankranti is Basundhara theki.

== Local celebrations ==
Ghantapatuas are traditional male folk artistes from the Odisha that perform the art form "Jhama nata" during Pana Sankranti. They generally perform in a group of two or four wearing dresses that resemble women's clothing.

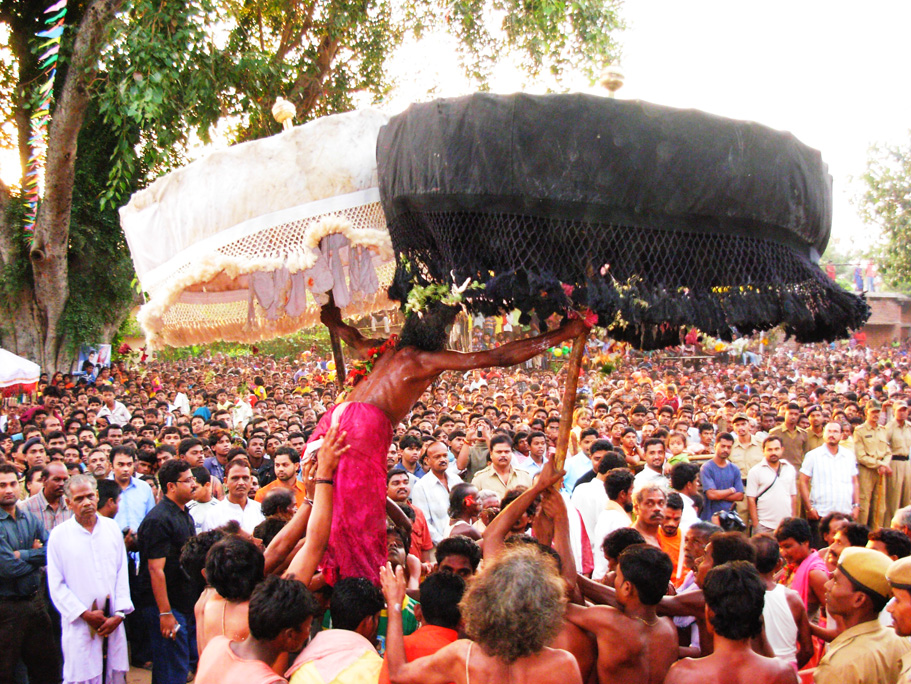
A group street performance on Pana Sankranti near the Lankeswari Temple, Sonepur, Odisha.

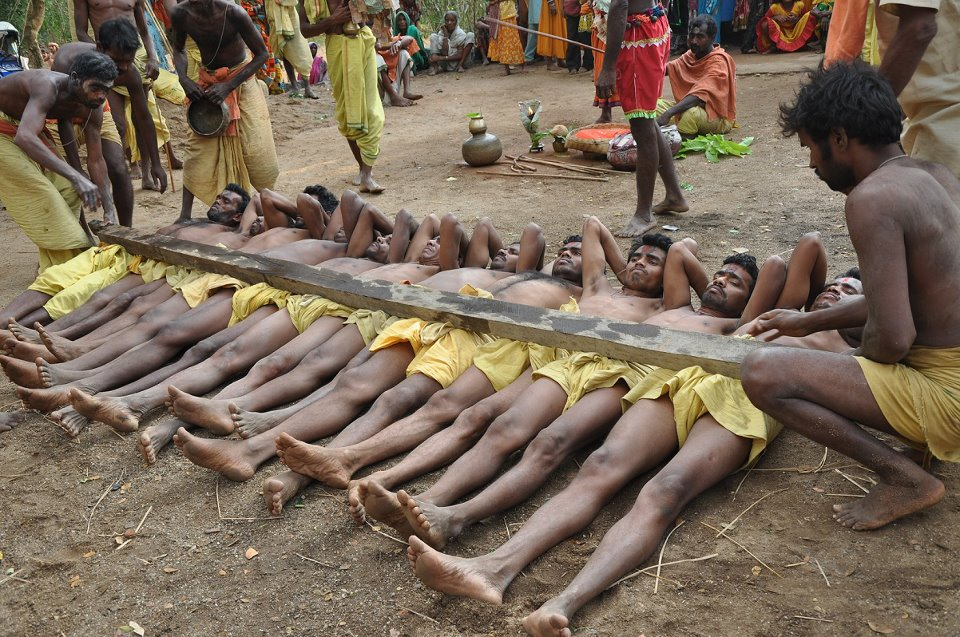
Danda nata, dedicated to the mother goddess starts on Pana Sankranti

Danda nata that is performed during this festival celebration is one of the most ancient forms of performance art of the region. The opening ritual begins in the middle of Chaitra (March – April). The performers, also known as Dandua, take dip in a village pond and walk/run over hot charcoals while performing the art. After performing danda nata they also perform jala danda by dipping themselves in deep water for a short while. These performances symbolize the liberation from physical pain. A notable climax of the social celebrations is fire-walk, where volunteers sprint over a bed of burning coal while being cheered with music and songs.

== Related holidays ==
This new year day is celebrated elsewhere across South and Southeast Asia which follow the related Hindu-Buddhist solar calendar traditions of South and Southeast Asian solar New Year (Mesha Sankranti and Songkran). It is known Vaisakhi across North India and Nepal and marks the beginning of the Hindu Solar New Year. The same day every year is also the new year for many Buddhist communities in parts of southeast Asia such as Myanmar, Sri Lanka and Cambodia, likely an influence of their shared culture in the 1st millennium CE. Some examples include:

- Vaisakhi in North India and Nepal
- Pohela Boishakh in states of West Bengal and Bangladesh
- Bohag Bihu in Assam
- Jur Sital in Mithila
- Puthandu in Tamil Nadu
- Vishu in Kerala
- Aluth Avuruthu in Sri Lanka
- Songkran in Thailand
- Chol Chnam Thmey in Cambodia
- Pi Mai Lao in Laos
- Thingyan in Burma

However, this is not the universal new year for all Hindus. For many others who follow the Lunar calendar, the new year falls on Chaitra Navaratri, Ugadi, Gudi Padwa etc., which falls a few weeks earlier. For some, such as those in and near Gujarat, the new year festivities coincide during the five day Diwali festival.

== See also ==
- Chandaneswar, Shiva temple in Odisha, India
