= Ghantapatua =

- Dates: Month of Pana Sankranti
- Locations: Odisha, India

Ghantapatuas (Odia: "ଘଣ୍ଟପାଟୁଆ") are traditional male folk dancers from the Indian state of Odisha. They work as temple servants or sevayats in the temple of the Goddess. They belong to the Bhopa or Raula caste.

== Etymology ==
The name ghantapatua comes from Oriya words ghanta (brass bell) used in Jagannath temple and the goddess temples of Odisha, and patua (performer).

== Ghata ==
The ghata is an earthen pitcher filled with holy water kept on a wooden stand cemented by mud, vermilion and above it a flower-clad jalli made up of coconut leaf sticks with flower hangings which represents the Goddess they worship.

== Ghanta ==
The ghanta is the main accompanying instrument.

== Dance ==
The dance is an offering to the goddesses Sarala, Hingula, Charchika, Bhagabati, Mangala and Chandi as servants.

The dance normally includes two to four men. One, the ghantpatua dresses as the Goddess and is the ghata bearer and dancer. The others beat the ghantas and are called ghantuas.

The ghantpatua keeps the ghata on his head. He dances without touching it and with ranapa (wooden sticks) tied to each leg.

After the dance they distribute sacred bel leaves and vermilion to the public (bhaktas). People offer them money, rice, vegetables, coconut, sarees and dhotis that they later distribute among themselves.

== Performance ==
The dance is offered in village after village throughout the month of Chaitra (March to April) in Hindu calendar. The final performance comes on Maha Vishuva Sankranti or Pana Sankranti, which falls normally on 13 or 14 April. It is celebrated as Odia New Year.
