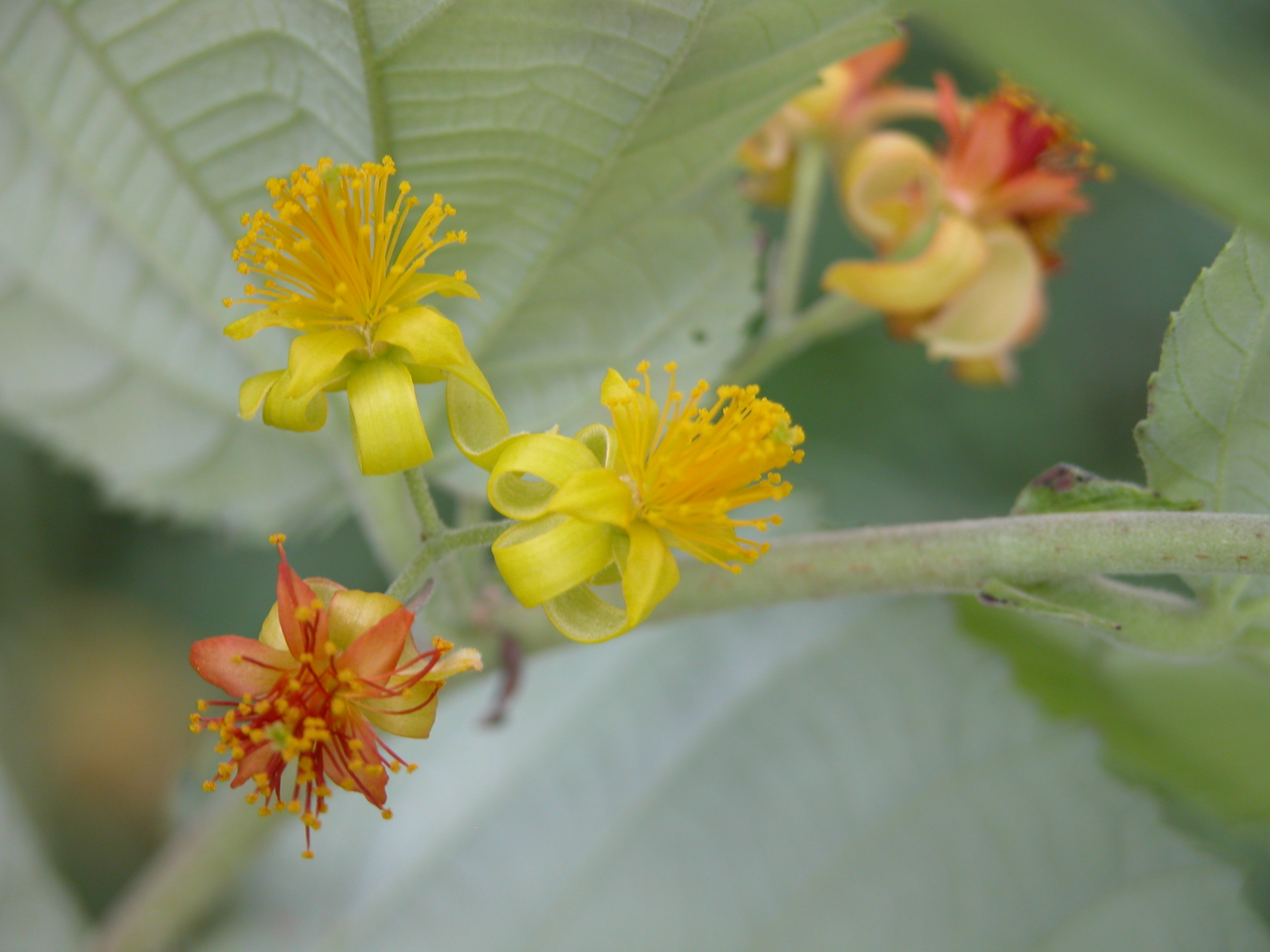
- Flowers and leaves
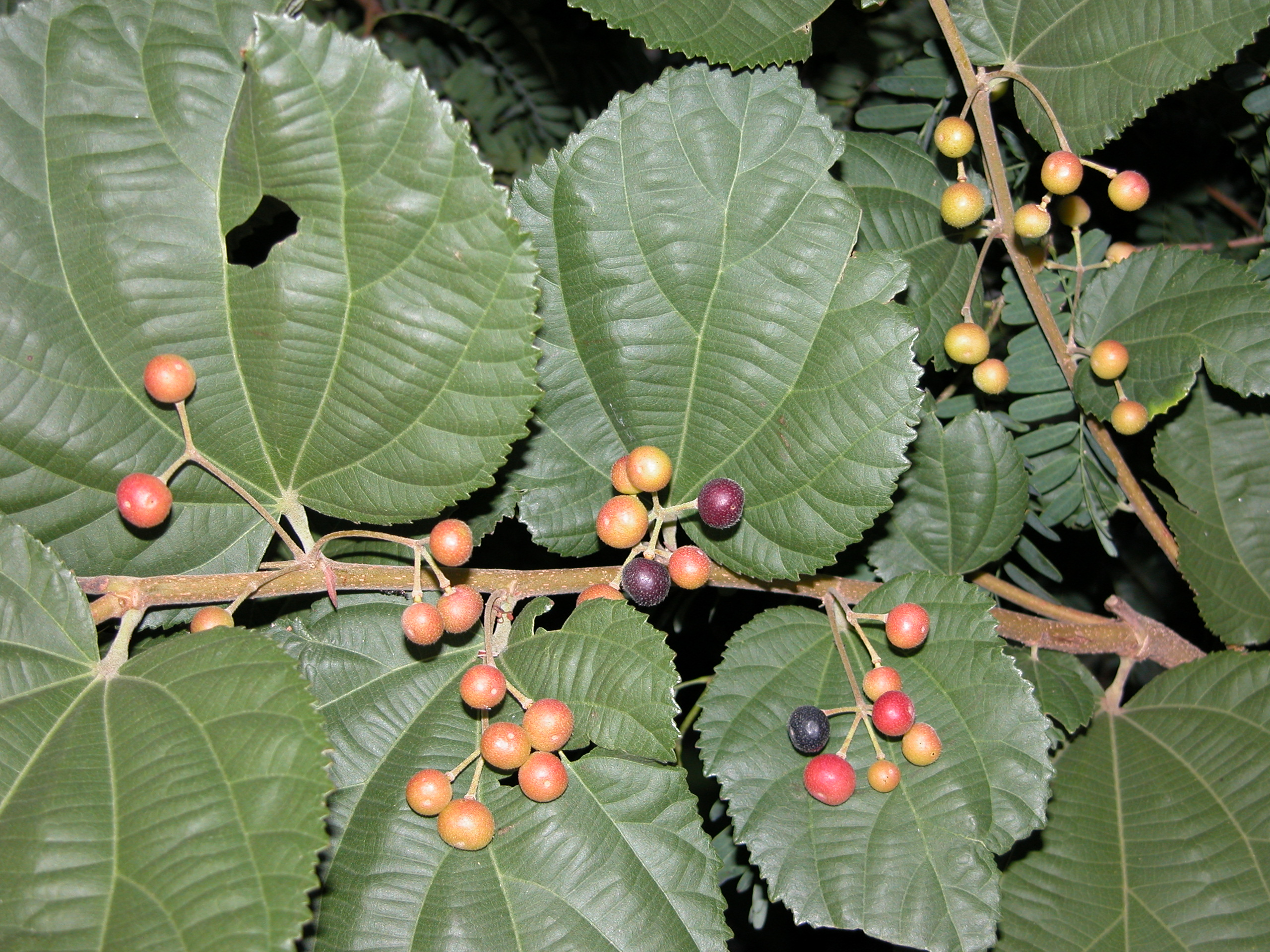

Conservation status
- Least Concern (IUCN 3.1)

Scientific classification
- Kingdom: Plantae
- Clade: Embryophytes
- Clade: Tracheophytes
- Clade: Spermatophytes
- Clade: Angiosperms
- Clade: Eudicots
- Clade: Rosids
- Order: Malvales
- Family: Malvaceae
- Genus: Grewia
- Species: G. asiatica

Binomial name
- Grewia asiatica L.

Synonyms
- Grewia hainesiana Hole; Grewia obtecta Wall.; Grewia subinaequalis DC.

= Grewia asiatica =

Species of flowering plant in the mallow family

Grewia asiatica, commonly known as phalsa or falsa, is a species of flowering plant in the mallow family Malvaceae. Grewia celtidifolia was initially considered a mere variety of phalsa, but is now recognized as a distinct species.

It is a shrub or small tree growing to 8 m tall. The leaves are broadly rounded, 5–18 cm long and broad, with a petiole 1–1.5 cm long. The flowers are produced in cymes of several together, the individual flowers about 2 cm diameter, yellow, with five large (12 mm) sepals and five smaller (4–5 mm) petals. The fruit is an edible drupe 5–12 mm diameter, purple to black when ripe.

== Cultivation and uses ==
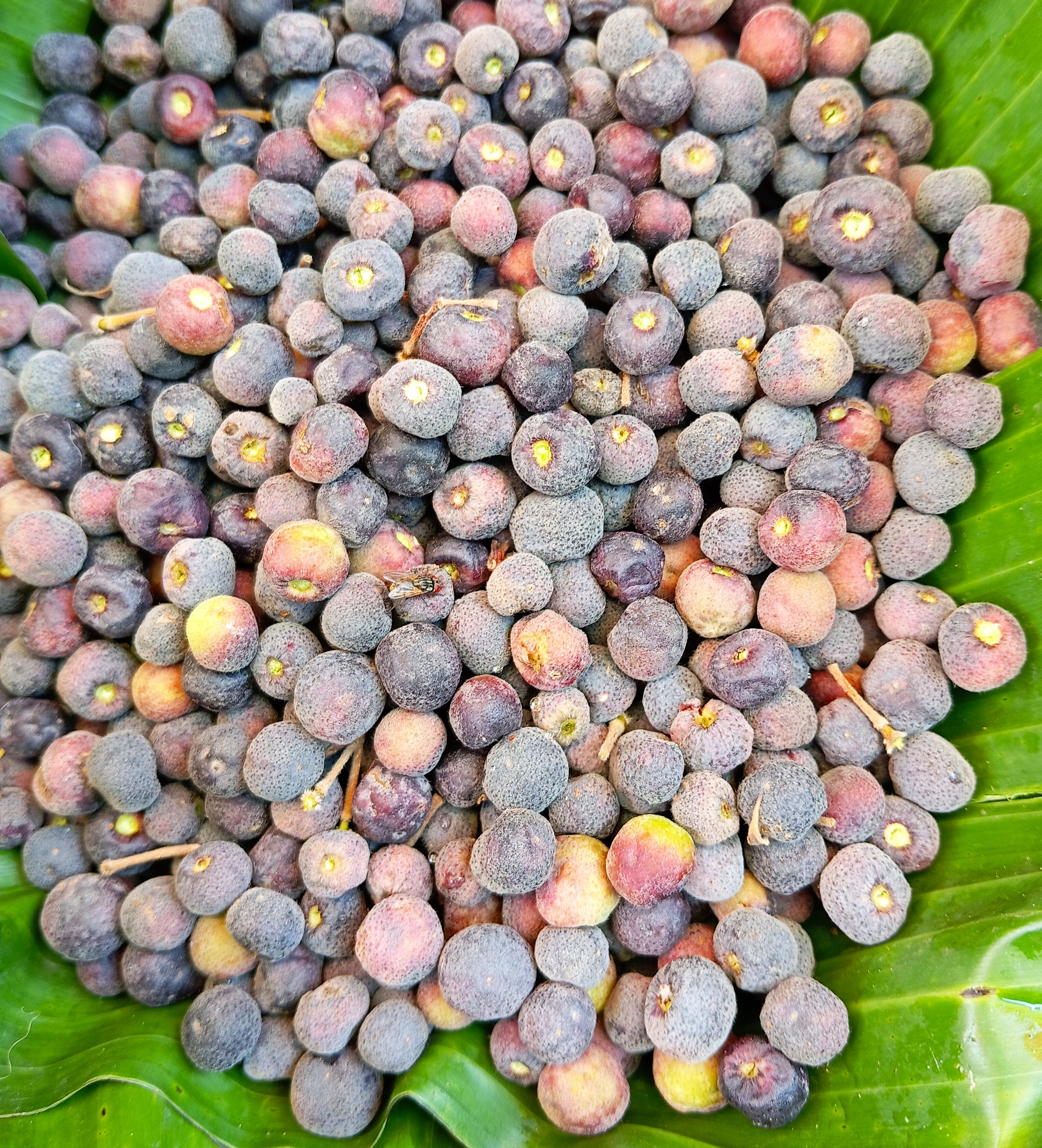
Phalsa fruits (Grewia asiatica), Kolkata, West Bengal, India

It is extensively cultivated for its sweet and sour acidic fruit, which is sold in the market during the summer months under the name falsa. The flower blooms in April and the fruit is ripe by the end of May. It is available for a very short period in the market, and is at its maximum by the middle of June. A Sharbat or squash is prepared from the fruit pulp by mixing it with sugar and used as an astringent, stomachic and cooling agent.

The root is used by Santhal tribals for rheumatisms. The stem bark is said to be used in refining sugar, for making ropes and its infusion is used as a demulcent. The leaves are used as an application to pustular eruptions. The buds are also prescribed by some physicians.

It has become naturalised and locally invasive in Australia and the Philippines.
