= Stomachic =

Historical group of drugs

Stomachic is a historic term for a medicine that serves to tone the stomach, improving its function and increase appetite. While many herbal remedies claim stomachic effects, modern pharmacology does not have an equivalent term for this type of action.

Herbs with putative stomachic effects include:

- Agrimony
- Aloe
- Anise
- Avens (Geum urbanum)
- Barberry
- Bitterwood (Picrasmaa excelsa)
- Cannabis
- Cayenne
- Centaurium
- Cleome
- Colombo (herb) (Frasera carolinensis)
- Dandelion
- Elecampane
- Ginseng
- Goldenseal
- Grewia asiatica (Phalsa or Falsa)
- Hops
- Holy thistle
- Juniper berry
- Mint
- Mugwort
- Oregano
- Peach bark
- Rhubarb
- White mustard seeds
- Rose hips
- Rue
- Sweet flag (Acorus calamus)
- Wormwood (Artemisia absinthium)

The purported stomachic mechanism of action of these substances is to stimulate the appetite by increasing the gastric secretions of the stomach; however, the actual therapeutic value of some of these compounds is dubious. Some other important agents used are:

- Bitters: used to stimulate the taste buds, thus producing reflex secretion of gastric juices. Quassia, Aristolochia, gentian, and chirata are commonly used.
- Alcohol: increases gastric secretion by direct action and also by the reflex stimulation of taste buds.
- Miscellaneous compounds: including insulin which increases the gastric secretion by producing hypoglycemia, and histamine, which produces direct stimulation of gastric glands.
