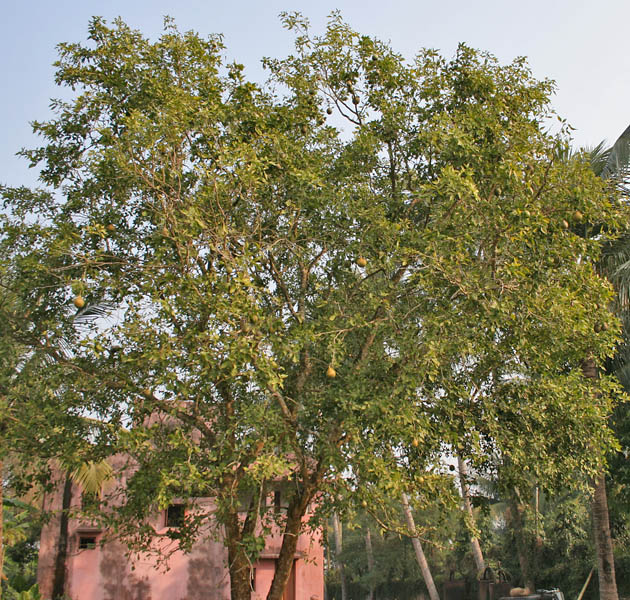

Conservation status
- Near Threatened (IUCN 3.1)

Scientific classification
- Kingdom: Plantae
- Clade: Tracheophytes
- Clade: Angiosperms
- Clade: Eudicots
- Clade: Rosids
- Order: Sapindales
- Family: Rutaceae
- Subfamily: Aurantioideae
- Genus: Aegle; Corrêa
- Species: A. marmelos

Binomial name
- Aegle marmelos (L.) Corrêa

Synonyms
- Belou marmelos (L.) A.Lyons; Crateva marmelos L.

= Aegle marmelos =

Bael

Species of tree, considered sacred by Hindus

Aegle marmelos, commonly known as bael (a.k.a. bel, beli, or bhel), also Bengal quince, golden apple, Japanese bitter orange, stone apple or wood apple, is a species of tree native to the Indian subcontinent and Southeast Asia. It is present in India, Pakistan, Bangladesh, Sri Lanka, and Nepal as a naturalized species. The tree is considered to be sacred by Hindus and Buddhists. Bael is the only member of the monotypic genus Aegle.

== Common names ==
The fruit has various common names, such as bael fruit, Indian bael, golden apple, elephant apple, Indian quince, and stone apple.

== Description ==
Aegle marmelos is a deciduous shrub or small to medium-sized tree, up to 13 metres (43 feet) tall with slender drooping branches and rather open, irregular crown.

=== Bark ===
The bark is pale brown or grayish, smooth or finely fissured and flaking, armed with long straight spines, 1.2–2.5 centimetres (1/2–1 inch) singly or in pairs, often with slimy sap oozing out from cut parts. The gum is also described as a clear, gummy sap, resembling gum arabic, which exudes from wounded branches and hangs down in long strands, becoming gradually solid. It is sweet at first taste and then irritating to the throat.

=== Leaves ===
The leaf is trifoliate, alternate, each leaflet 5–14 cm (2–5 1/2 in) x 2–6 cm (3/4–2 1/4 in), ovate with tapering or pointed tip and rounded base, untoothed or with shallow rounded teeth. Young leaves are pale green or pinkish, finely hairy while mature leaves are dark green and completely smooth. Each leaf has 4–12 pairs of side veins which are joined at the margin.

=== Flowers ===
The flowers are 1.5 to 2 cm, pale green or yellowish, sweetly scented, bisexual, in short drooping unbranched clusters at the end of twigs and leaf axils. They usually appear with young leaves. The calyx is flat with 4(5) small teeth. The four or five petals of 6–8 millimetres (1/4–3/8 in) overlap in the bud. Many stamens have short filaments and pale brown, short style anthers. The ovary is bright green with an inconspicuous disc.

=== Fruits ===
The fruit typically has a diameter of between 5 and 10 cm (2 and 4 in). It is globose or slightly pear-shaped with a thick, hard rind and does not split upon ripening. The woody shell is smooth and green, gray until it is fully ripe when it turns yellow. Inside are 8 to 15 or 20 sections filled with aromatic orange pulp, each section with 6 (8) to 10 (15) flattened-oblong seeds each about 1 cm long, bearing woolly hairs and each enclosed in a sac of adhesive, transparent mucilage that solidifies on drying. The exact number of seeds varies in different publications. The fruit takes about 11 months to ripen on the tree, reaching maturity in December. It can reach the size of a large grapefruit or pomelo, and some are even larger. The shell is so hard it must be cracked with a hammer or machete. The fibrous yellow pulp is aromatic. It has been described as tasting of marmalade and smelling of roses. Boning (2006) indicates that the flavor is "sweet, aromatic and pleasant, although tangy and slightly astringent in some varieties. It resembles a marmalade made, in part, with citrus and, in part, with tamarind." Numerous hairy seeds are encapsulated in a slimy mucilage.

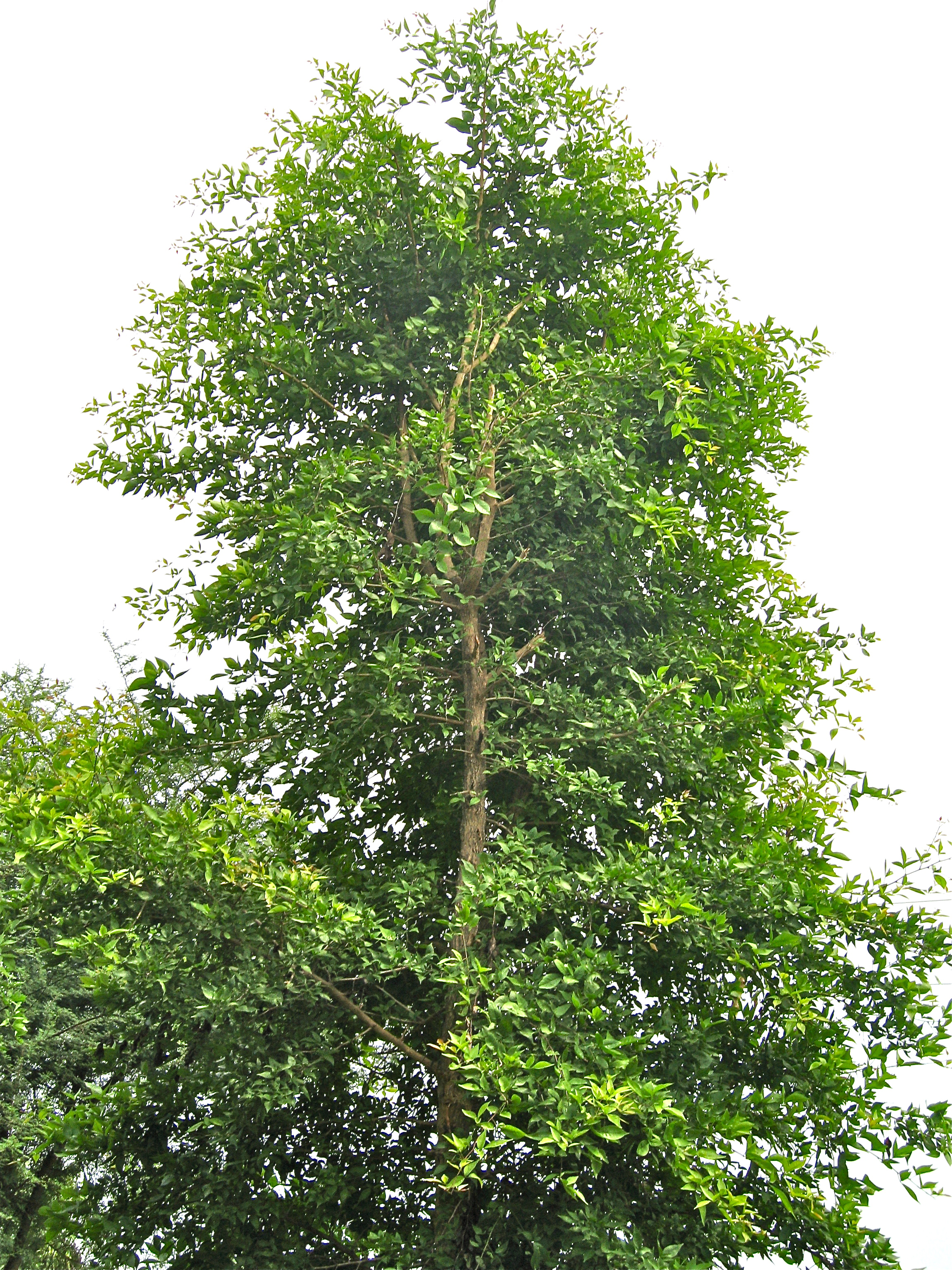
Tree

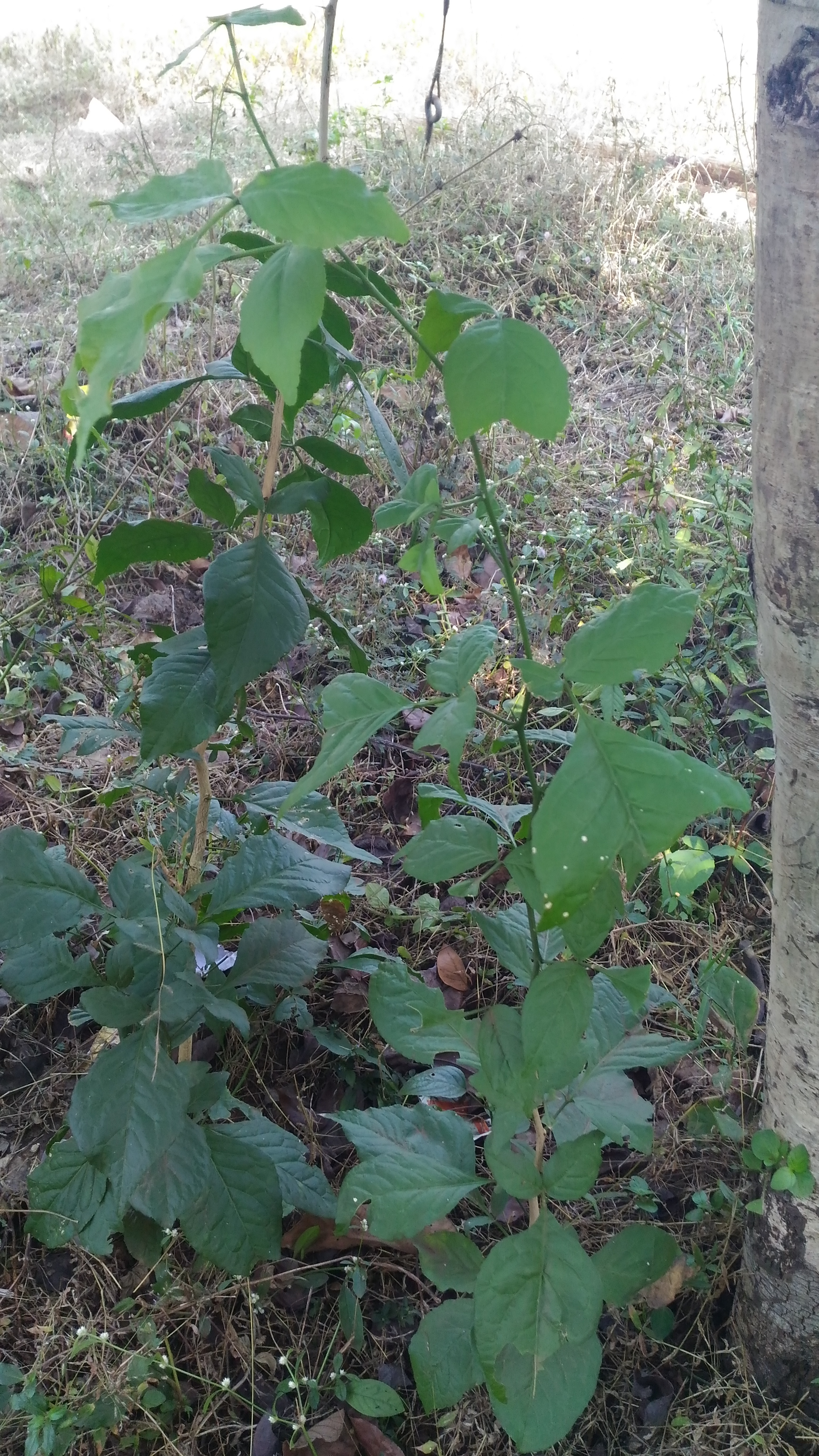
Small plant

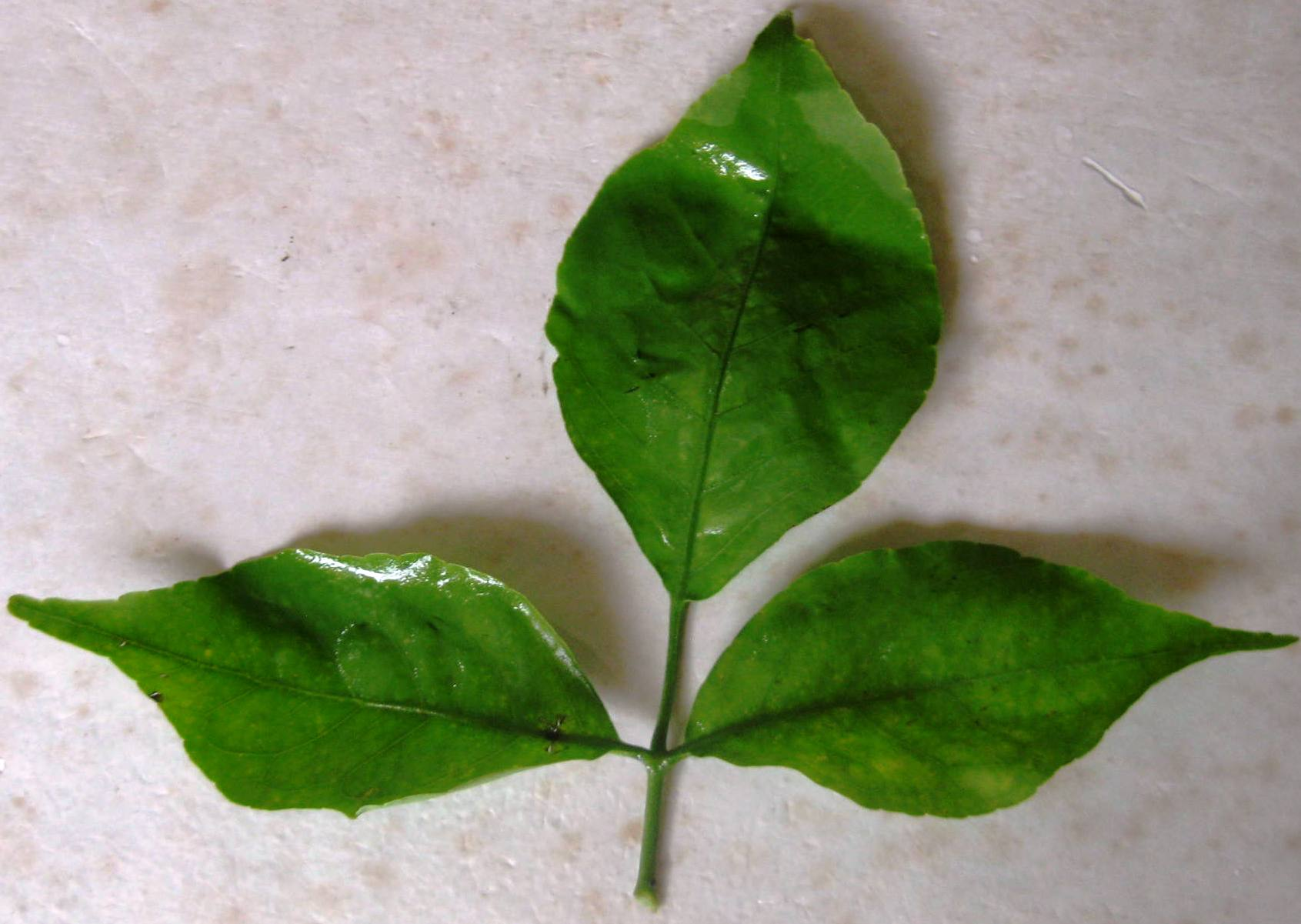
Leaf

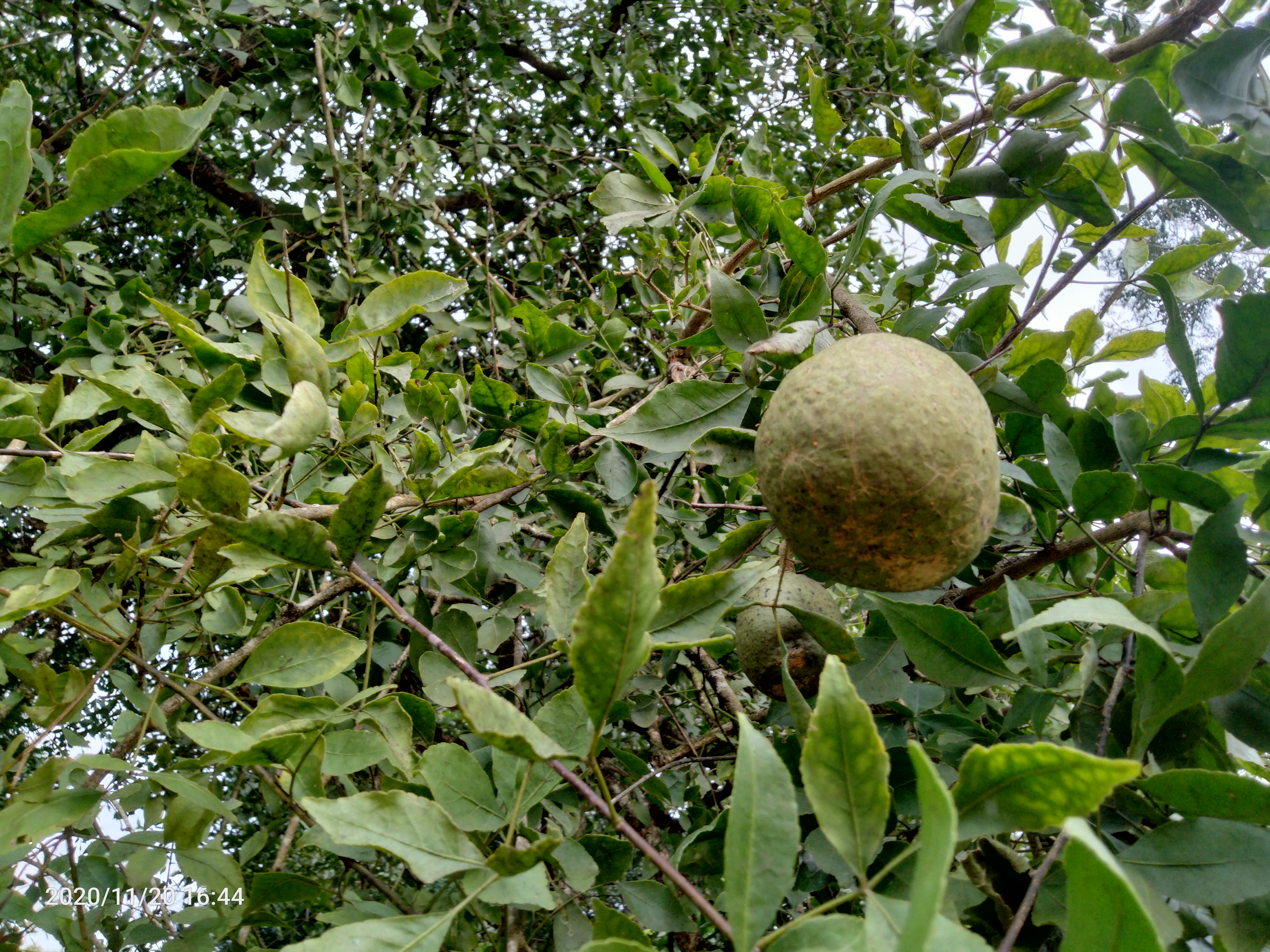
Leaves and fruit

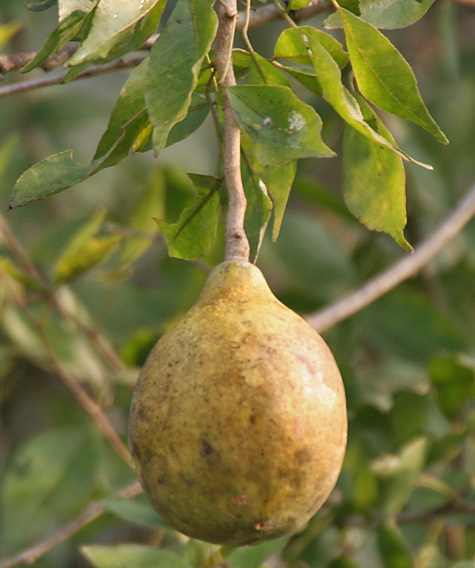
Ripe fruit, India

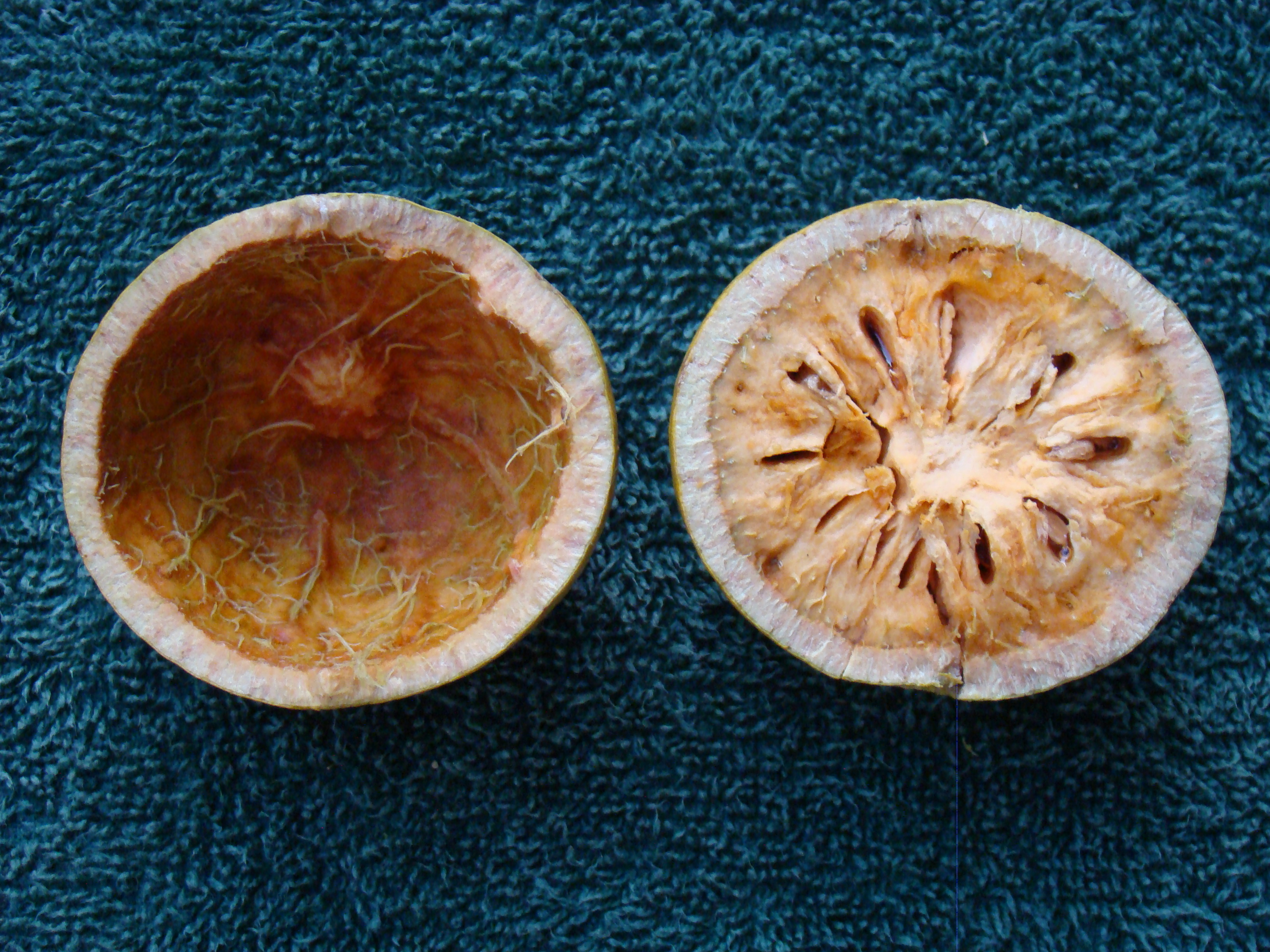
Fruit interior

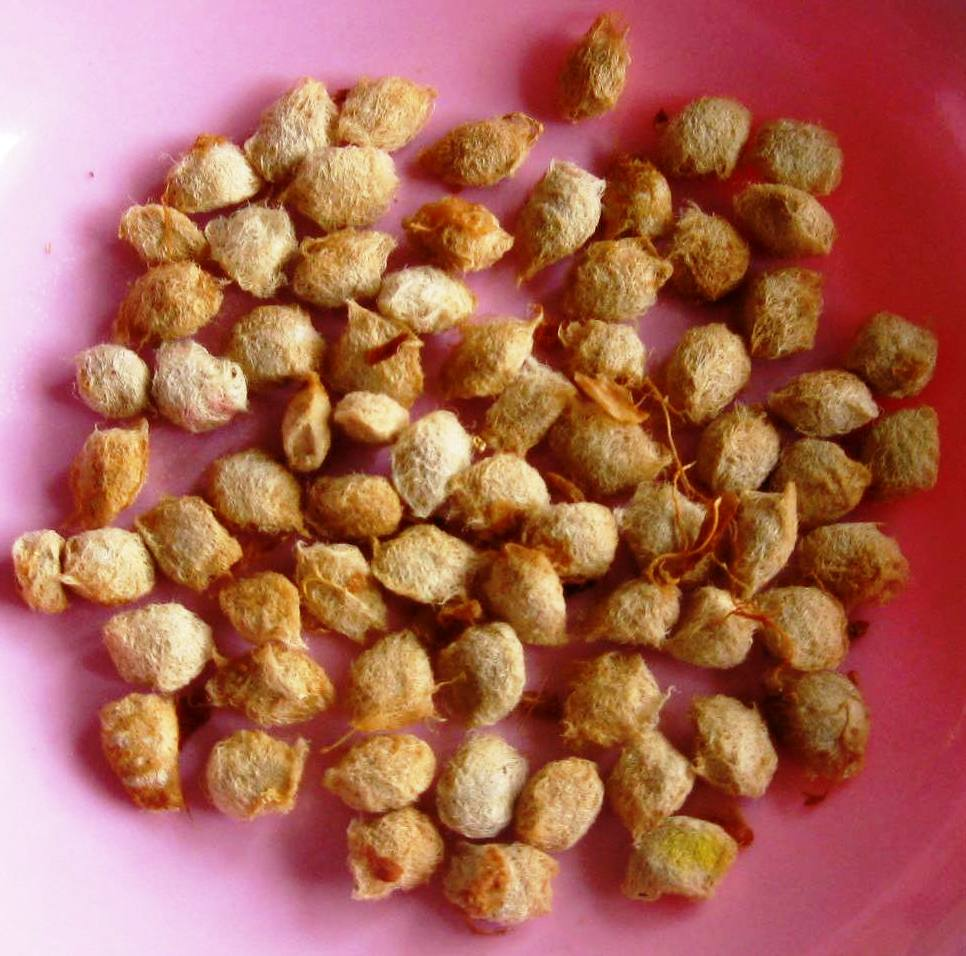
Ripe fruit dried seeds

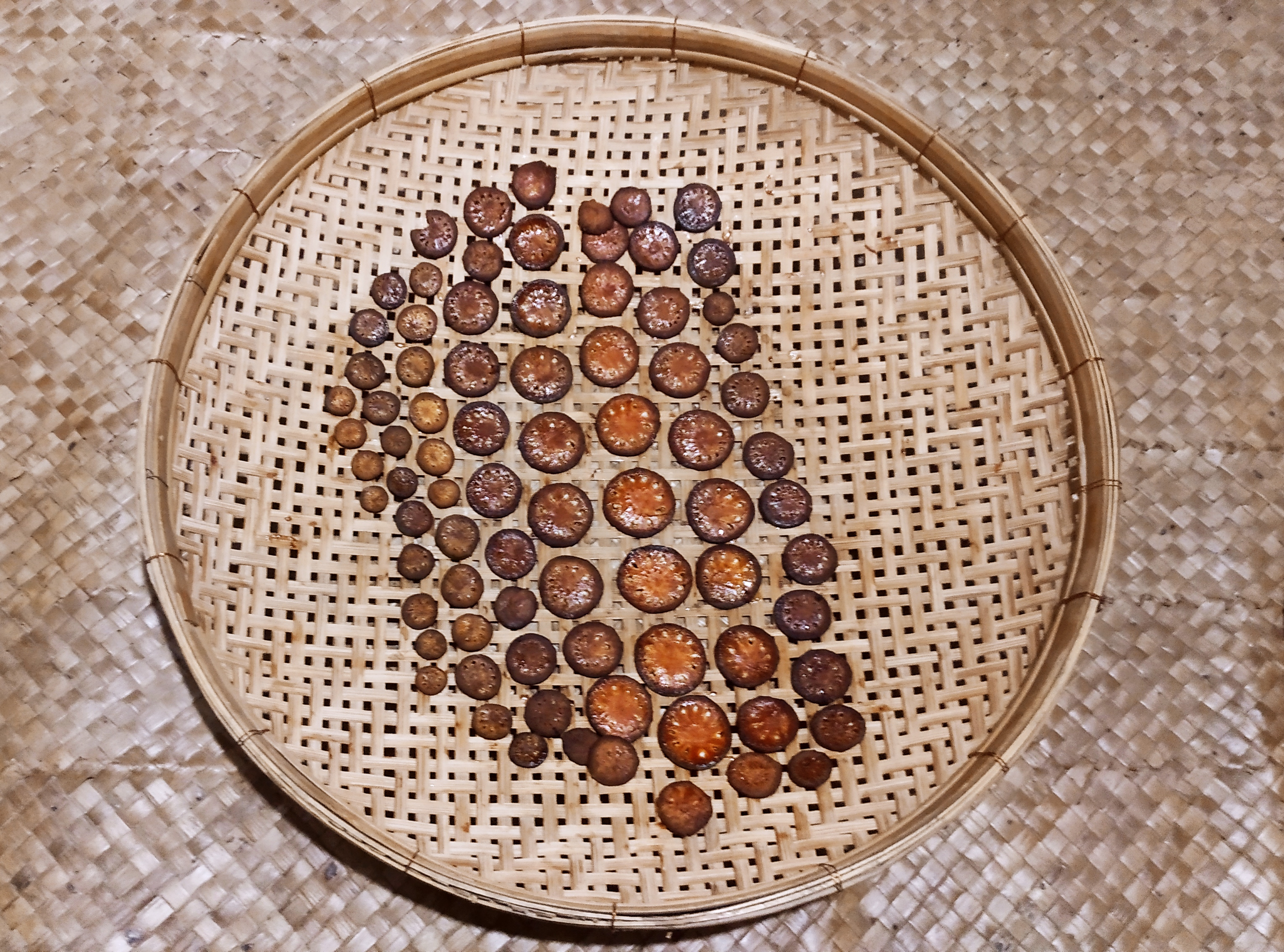
Dry fruit slices

=== Chemistry ===
The bael tree contains furocoumarins, including xanthotoxol and the methyl ester of alloimperatorin, as well as flavonoids, rutin and marmesin; a number of essential oils; and, among its alkaloids, á-fargarine(=allocryptopine), O-isopentenylhalfordinol, O-methylhafordinol. Aegeline (N-[2-hydroxy-2(4-methoxyphenyl) ethyl]-3-phenyl-2-propenamide) is a constituent that can be extracted from bael leaves. Aeglemarmelosine has been isolated as an orange viscous oil.

== Habit and habitat ==
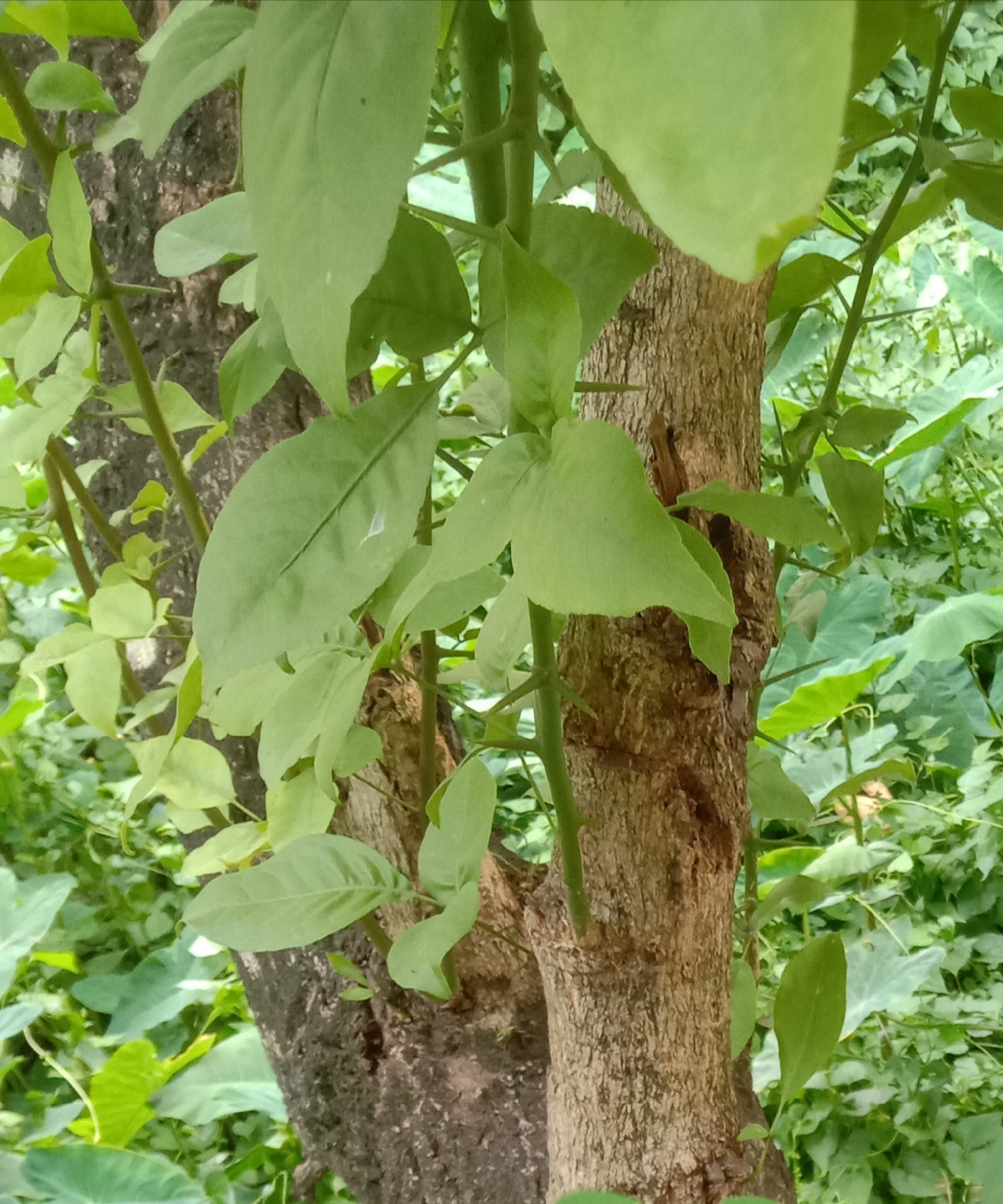
Trunks and leaves of Indian bael (Aegle marmelos) in West Bengal, India.

Aegle marmelos is native across the Indian subcontinent and Southeast Asia, and is cultivated throughout Sri Lanka, Tamilnadu, Thailand, and Malesia. Studies indicate the origin of the bael fruit in India, in the Eastern Ghats and in the central to northern parts of the country. In this country, states where the bael fruit is grown include Uttar Pradesh, states in Eastern India (Bihar, West Bengal, Madhya Pradesh, Jharkhand, and Orissa), as well as in the Himalayan foothills, the Deccan plateau and the Indo-Gangetic plains.

It occurs in dry, open forests on hills and plains at altitudes from 0–1,200 m (0–3,937 ft) with mean annual rainfall of 570–2,000 mm (22–79 in). It has a reputation in India for being able to grow in places that other trees cannot. It copes with a wide range of soil conditions (pH range 5–10), is tolerant of waterlogging and has an unusually wide temperature tolerance from −7–48 °C (19–118 °F). It requires a pronounced dry season to give fruit.

== Toxicity ==
Aegeline is a known constituent of the bael leaf and consumed as a dietary supplement with the intent to produce weight loss. In 2013, the U.S. Food and Drug Administration (FDA), Centers for Disease Control and Prevention (CDC), the Department of Defense Armed Forces Health Surveillance Center, and Hawaii state and local health officials identified an outbreak of 97 persons with acute non-viral hepatitis that first emerged in Hawaii. Seventy-two of these persons had reported using the dietary supplement OxyElite Pro, containing aegeline, which was manufactured by the Dallas-based company USPlabs. FDA had previously taken action against an earlier formulation of OxyElite Pro because it contained dimethylamylamine, a stimulant that FDA had determined to be an adulterant when included in dietary supplements, and could cause high blood pressure and lead to heart attacks, seizures, psychiatric disorders, and death. USPlabs subsequently reformulated this product without informing the FDA or submitting the required safety data for a new dietary ingredient.

Doctors at the Liver Center at The Queen's Medical Center investigating the first cases in Hawaii reported that between May and September 2013, eight previously healthy individuals presented themselves at their center suffering from a drug-induced liver injury. All of these patients had been using the reformulated OxyElite Pro, which they had purchased from different sources, and which had different lot numbers and expiration dates, at doses within the manufacturer's recommendation. Three of these patients developed fulminant liver failure, two underwent urgent liver transplantation, and one died. The number of such cases ultimately rose to 44 in Hawaii. In January 2014, leaders from the Queen's Liver Center informed state lawmakers that they were almost certain that aegeline was the agent responsible for these cases, but the mechanism of how aegeline may damage the liver has not been isolated.

== Uses ==
=== Culinary ===
Rich in vitamin C, the fruits can be eaten either fresh from trees or after being dried and produced into candy, toffee, pulp powder or nectar. If fresh, the juice is strained and sweetened to make a drink similar to lemonade. The juice can be made into sharbat, also called bela pana.

=== Traditional medicine ===
The leaves, bark, roots, fruits, and seeds are used in traditional medicine to treat various illnesses.

== In culture ==
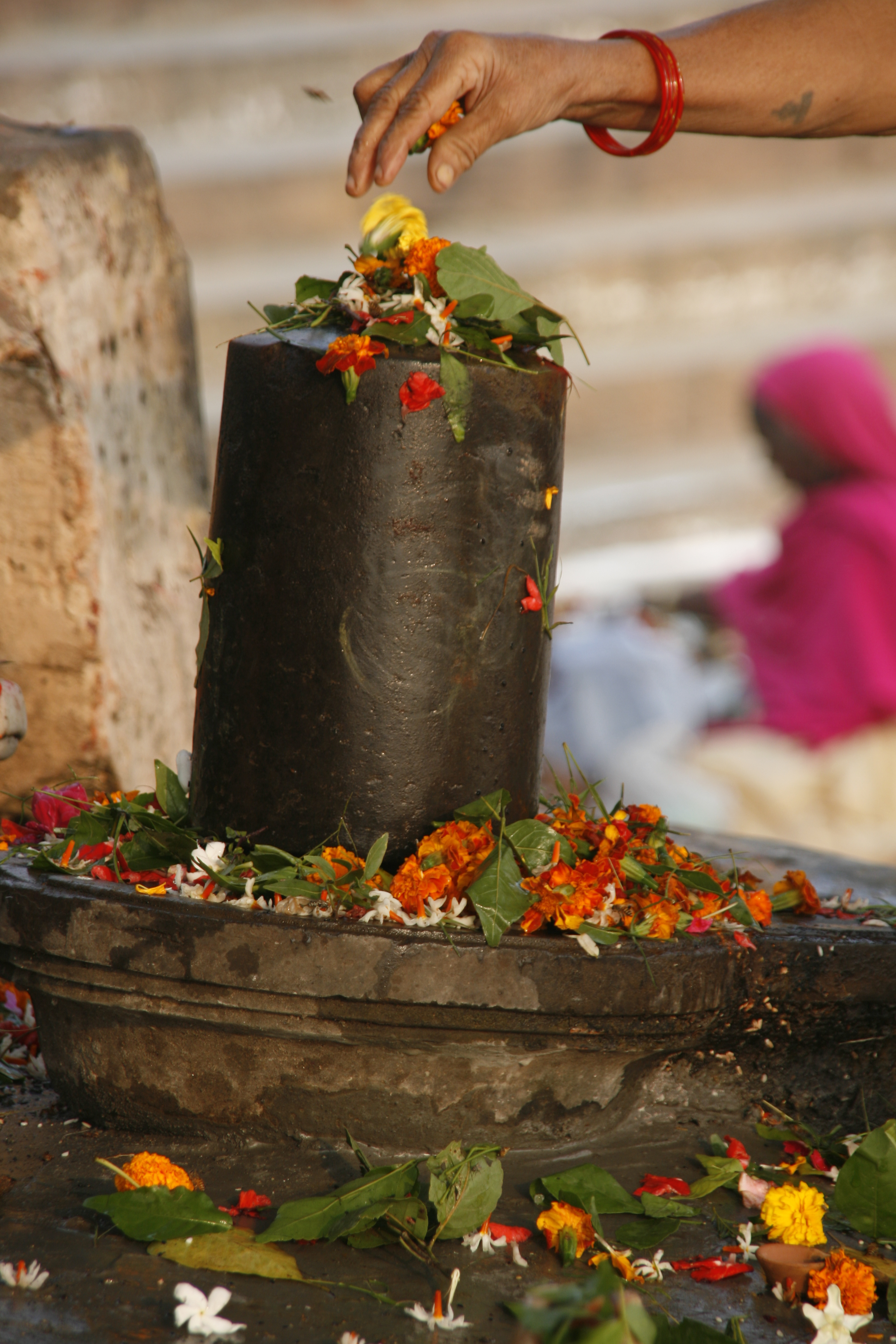
Leaves used in the worship of a lingam, the icon of Shiva

Bael is considered to be one of the sacred trees of Hindus, (known in Sanskrit as बिल्व bilva), and thus they are used in Hindu rites. Earliest evidence of the religious importance of bael appears in the Sri Sukta of the Rigveda, which reveres this plant as the residence of goddess Lakshmi, the deity of wealth and prosperity. Bael trees are also considered an incarnation of the goddess Sati. Bael trees can be usually seen near Hindu temples and home gardens. It is believed that Shiva is fond of bael trees, to a point of having earned the epithet बिल्वदण्ड Bilvadaṇḍa or "bel-staffed". Its leaves and fruit still play a main role in his worship, because the leaf's trifoliate shape is seen to symbolise his trident. Another belief is that the trifoliate shape of Bael leaf is symbolic representation of three eyes of Lord Shiva.

In the traditional practice of the Hindu and Buddhist religions by people of the Newar culture of Nepal, the bael tree is part of a fertility ritual for girls known as the Bel Bibaaha. Girls are "married" to the bael fruit; as long as the fruit is kept safe and never cracks, the girl can never become widowed, even if her human husband dies. This is a ritual that guarantees the high status of widows in the Newar community compared to other women in Nepal.

The fruit appears in the Buddhist scriptures as the Daddabha Jataka (J 322). In it, the Buddha tells an early version of the Henny Penny story, in which a hare is frighted by the fruit falling on a palm leaf.

== See also ==
- The Belbati Princess
- The Story of a Fairy and a Prince (Shan folktale)
