= Bela Pana =

Drink made from bael (Aegle marmelos) fruit pulp

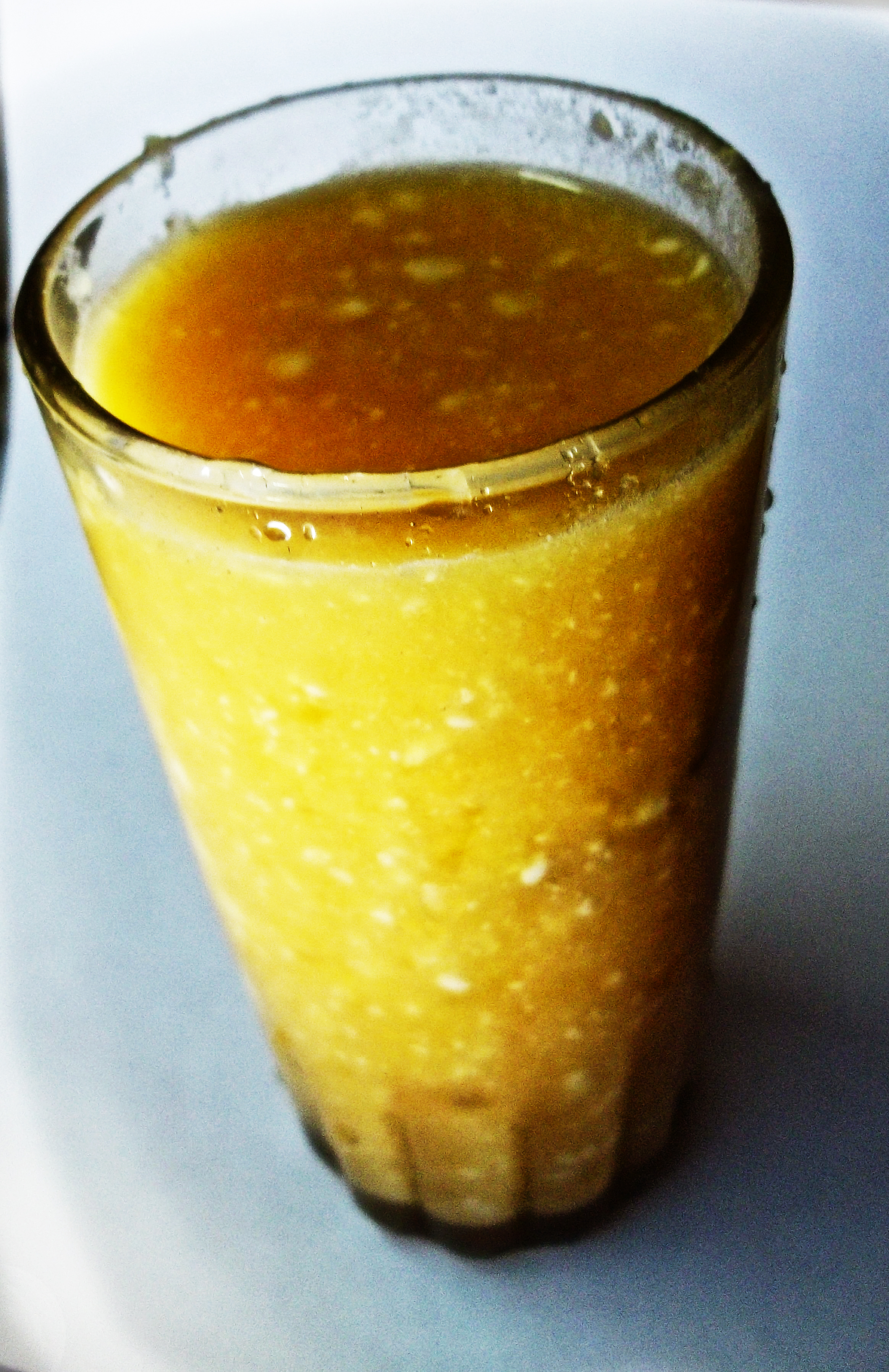
- Bela Pana
- Type: Drink
- Place of origin: India
- Region or state: Odisha, West Bengal, Jharkhand
- Created by: Odisha
- Main ingredients: bael

Bela Pana or Bael Juice (Odia: ବେଲ ପଣା) is a drink made from bael (Aegle marmelos) fruit pulp. It is used on the festive occasion of Pana Sankranti (Odia new year) during the month of Baisakha, in Odisha, India.

== Ingredients ==
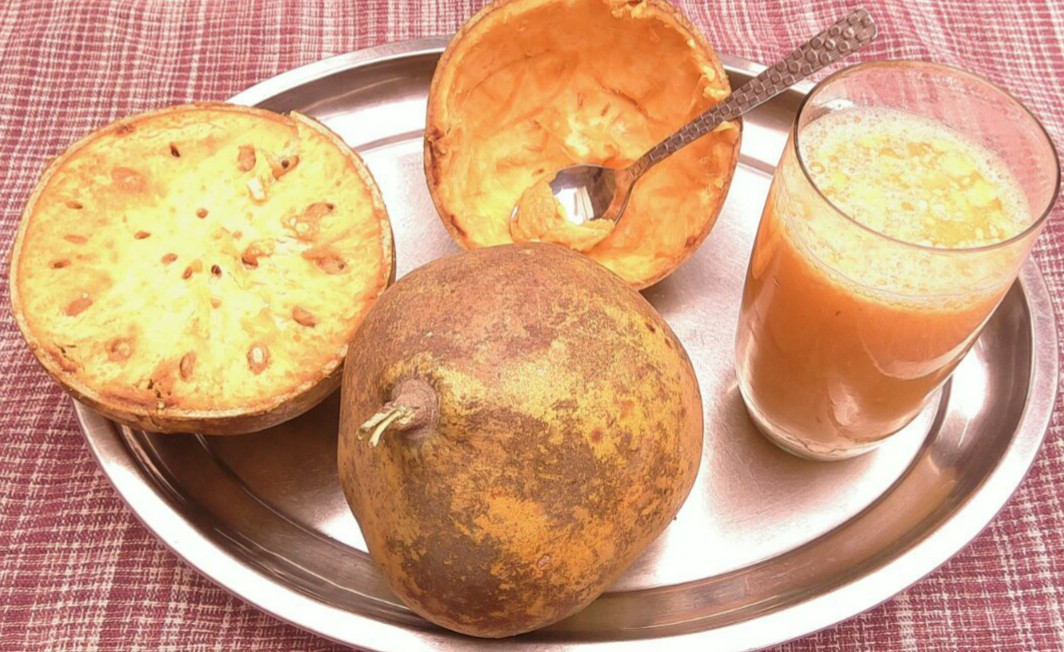
Bael with Bela Pana

Ripe bael, milk, black pepper, chhena, 1/4 cup (63 mL) banana peeled and cut into tiny pieces, 1/2 cup (125 mL) honey or Jaggery, 1/2 cup (125 mL) yogurt, 2 cardamom, a handful of cashews ground separately, fistful of fresh grated coconut.

== Utility ==
It is an antidote for sunstroke and a must in Odia New Year. It is also used for stomach problems.

== See also ==
- Odia cuisine
