= Lohusa şerbeti =

Turkish beverage

Lohusa Şerbeti
- Type: Soft drink
- Country of origin: Turkey
- Colour: Red
- Flavour: Sweet
- Ingredients: Water, sugar, cinnamon sticks, cloves, red food colour

Lohusa şerbeti 'post-partum drink' or lohusa sherbet is a beverage in Turkey made with water, sugar, cinnamon, cloves, and red food colour. It is served hot or cold, and is usually given to women after childbirth, often with the blessing sütün bol olsun 'may your milk be plentiful'.

It is also now shared with visitors and friends.
