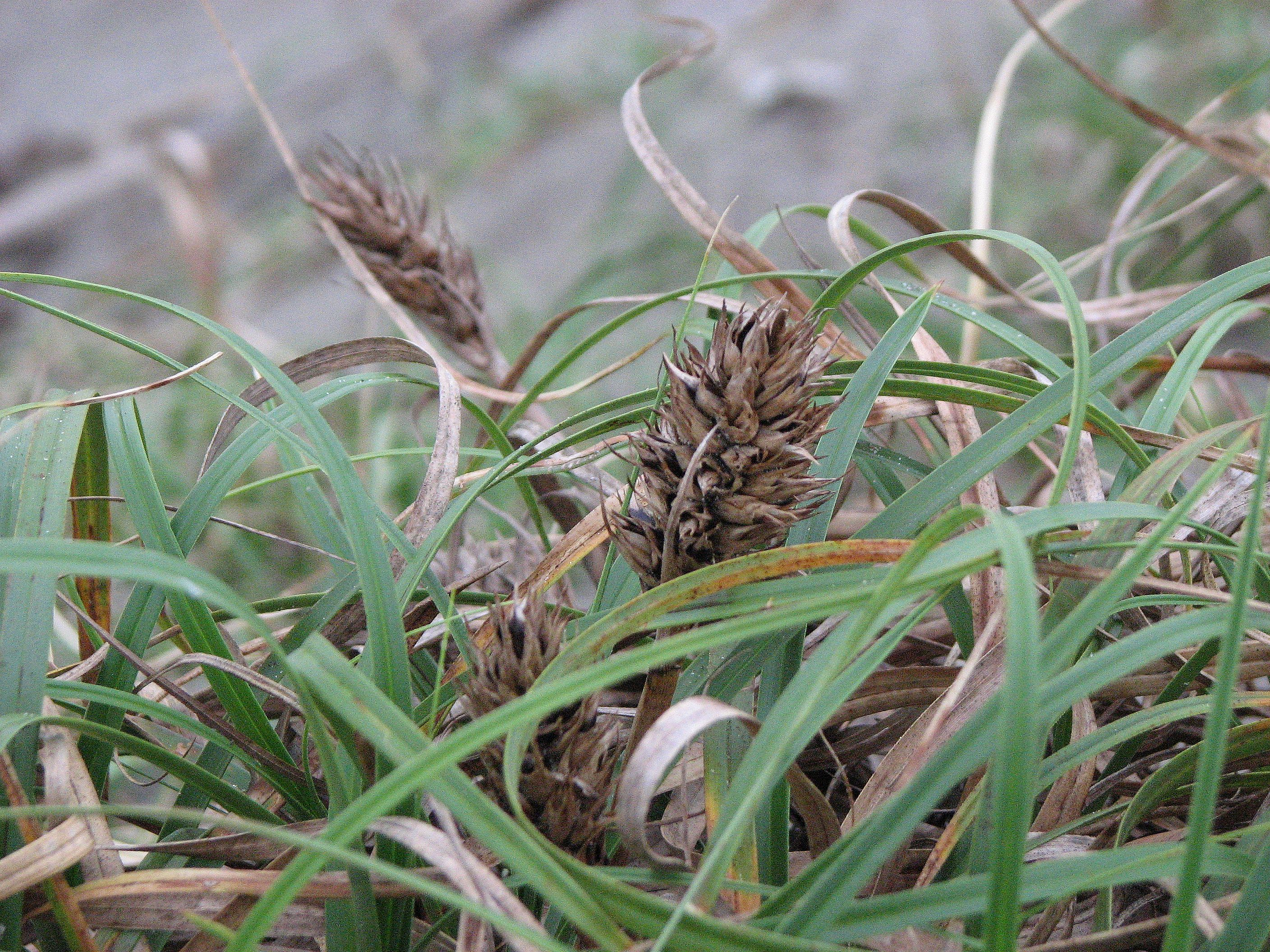
- Carex kobomugi

Scientific classification
- Kingdom: Plantae
- Clade: Tracheophytes
- Clade: Angiosperms
- Clade: Monocots
- Clade: Commelinids
- Order: Poales
- Family: Cyperaceae
- Genus: Carex
- Subgenus: Carex subg. Vignea
- Section: Carex sect. Macrocephalae; Kük.

Species
- Carex macrocephala; Carex kobomugi

= Carex sect. Macrocephalae =

Group of sedges

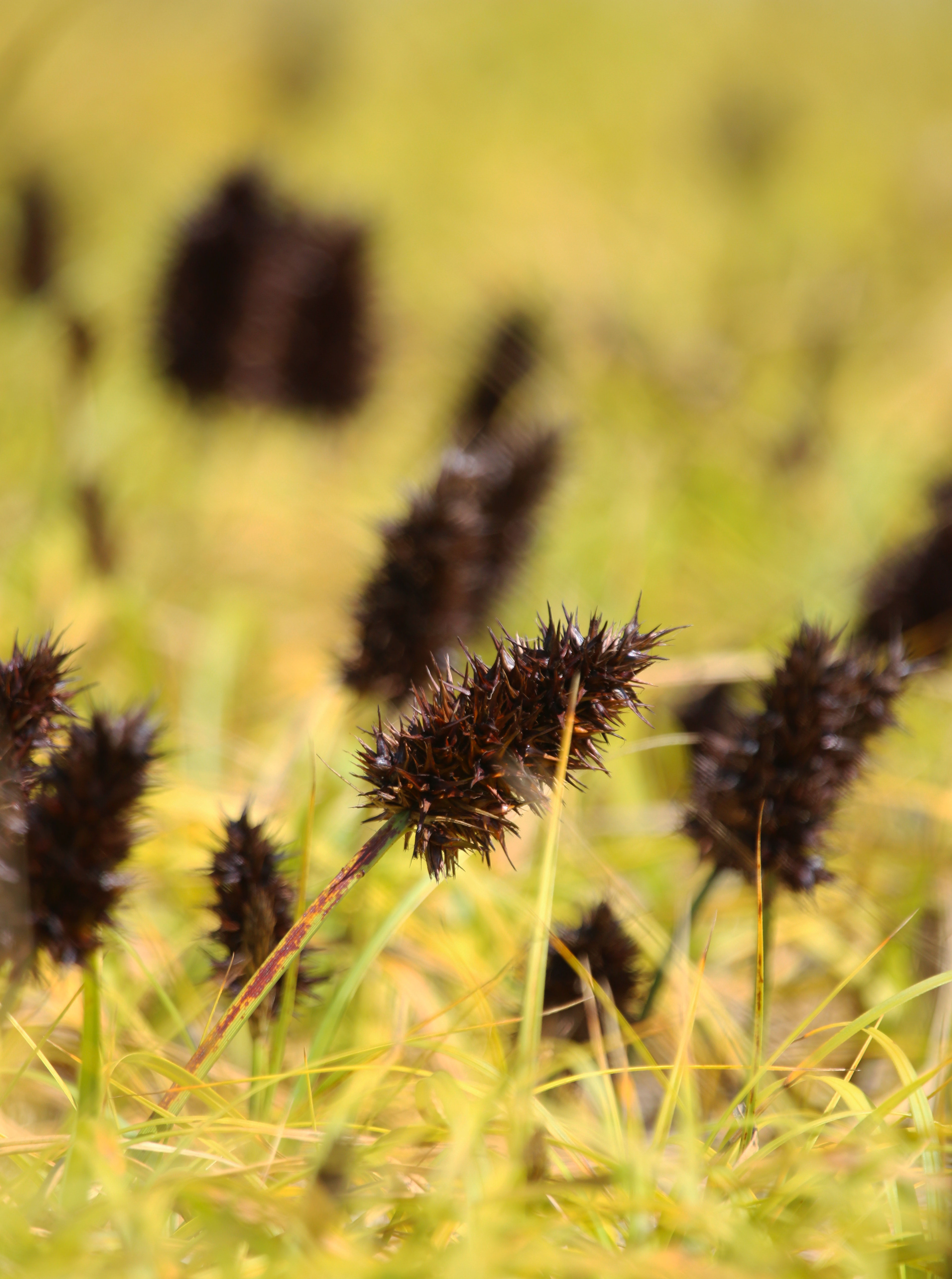
Bighead sedge (Carex macrocephala)

Carex sect. Macrocephalae is a section of the genus Carex, containing two species. Both are coastal species of sandy areas beside the northern Pacific Ocean – Carex kobomugi from Taiwan to northern China and Japan (and as an invasive species in the north-eastern United States), and Carex macrocephala from northern China to Oregon.
