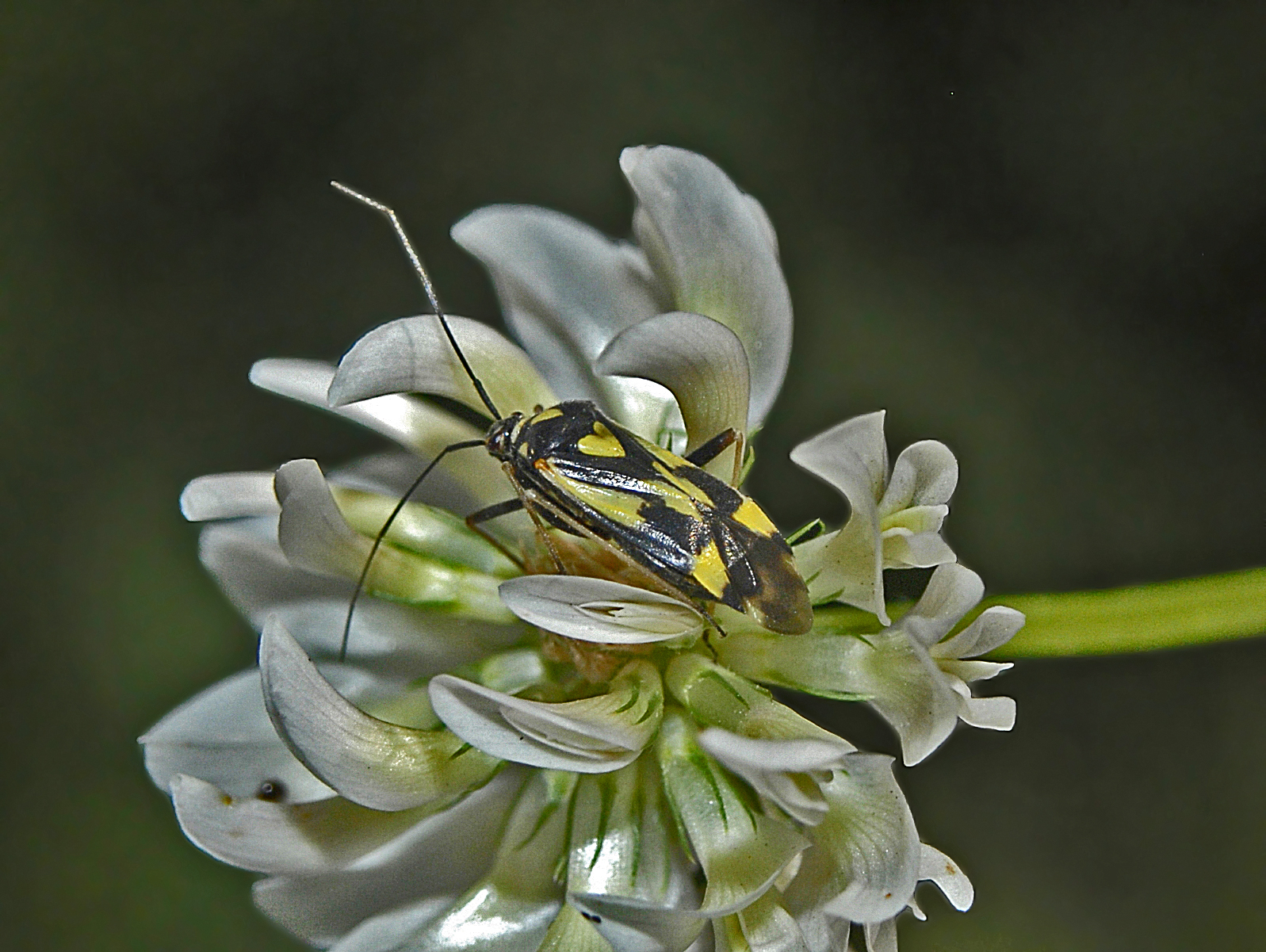

Scientific classification
- Kingdom: Animalia
- Phylum: Arthropoda
- Class: Insecta
- Order: Hemiptera
- Suborder: Heteroptera
- Family: Miridae
- Genus: Grypocoris
- Species: G. sexguttatus

Binomial name
- Grypocoris sexguttatus (Fabricius, 1777)

Synonyms
- Calocoris sexguttatus (Fabricius, 1777)

= Grypocoris sexguttatus =

Species of true bug

Grypocoris sexguttatus is a species of true bugs belonging to the family Miridae or plant bugs, subfamily Mirinae.

== Description ==
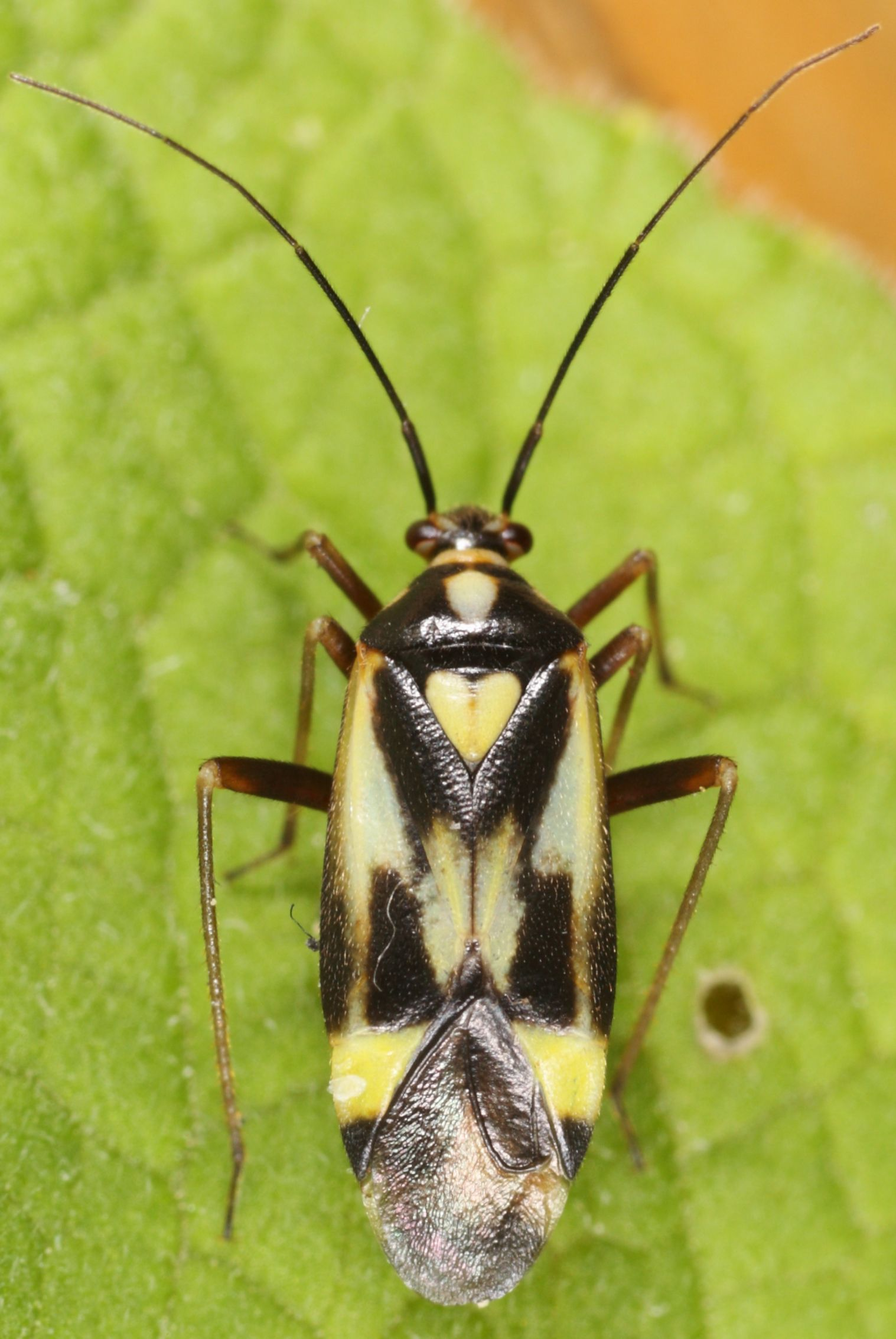
Female Grypocoris sexguttatus

Grypocoris sexguttatus can reach a length of 6.5–8.3 millimetres (0.26–0.33 in) in males, of 7–8 millimetres (0.28–0.31 in) in females.

== Distribution and habitat ==
This species is present in most of Europe. The preferred habitat are spruce forest edges.

== Biology ==
Nymphs can be found in May – June, while adults are present from June to August. These polyphagous bugs mainly feed on Heracleum sphondylium (nectar), Melampyrum pratense, Galeopsis tetrahit and Urtica dioica, but also on other insects, especially of the family Aphididae.
