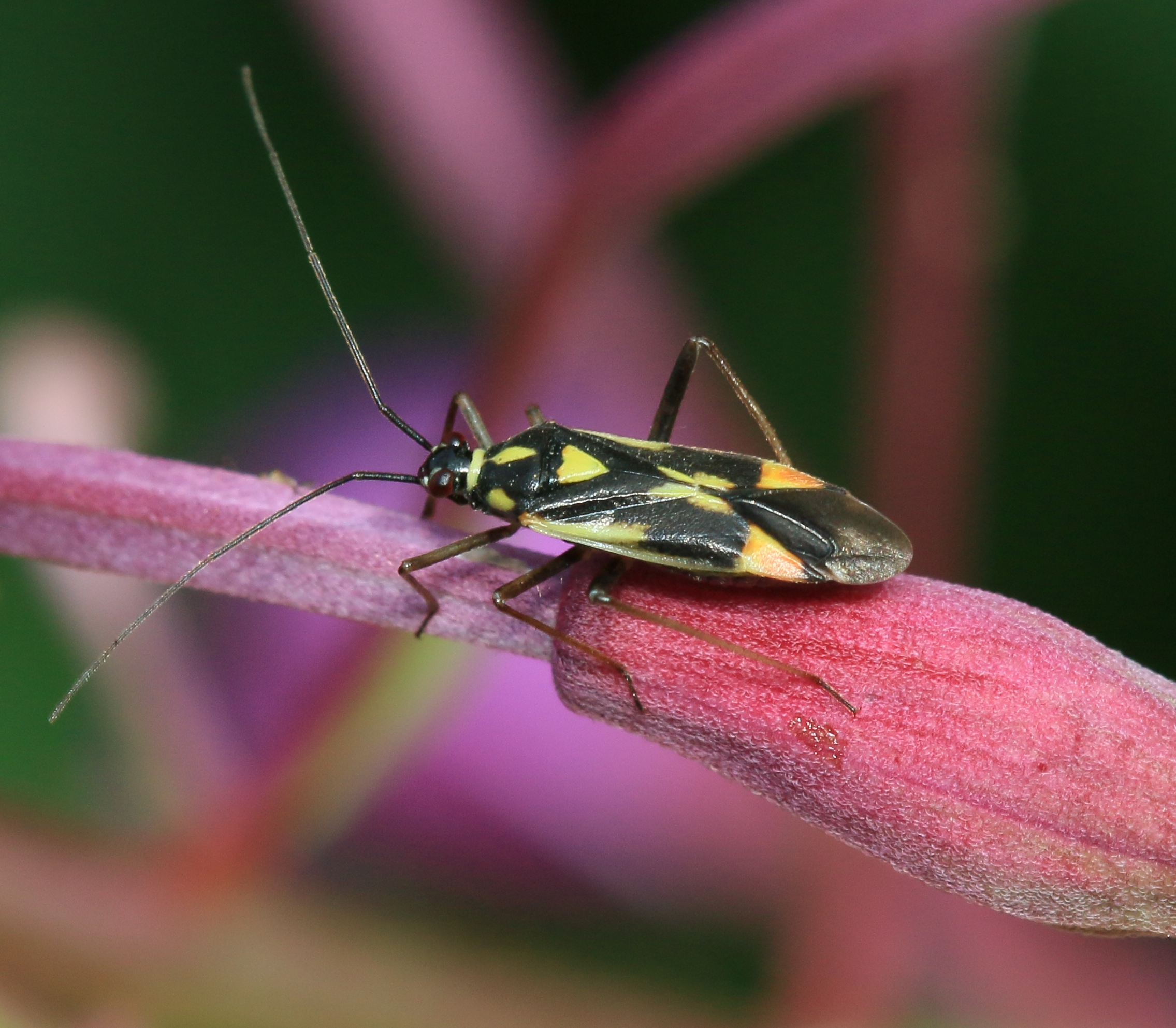
- Grypocoris stysi Scotland

Scientific classification
- Domain: Eukaryota
- Kingdom: Animalia
- Phylum: Arthropoda
- Class: Insecta
- Order: Hemiptera
- Suborder: Heteroptera
- Family: Miridae
- Genus: Grypocoris
- Species: G. stysi

Binomial name
- Grypocoris stysi (Wagner, 1968)

= Grypocoris stysi =

Species of true bug

Grypocoris stysi is a Palearctic species of true bug.
