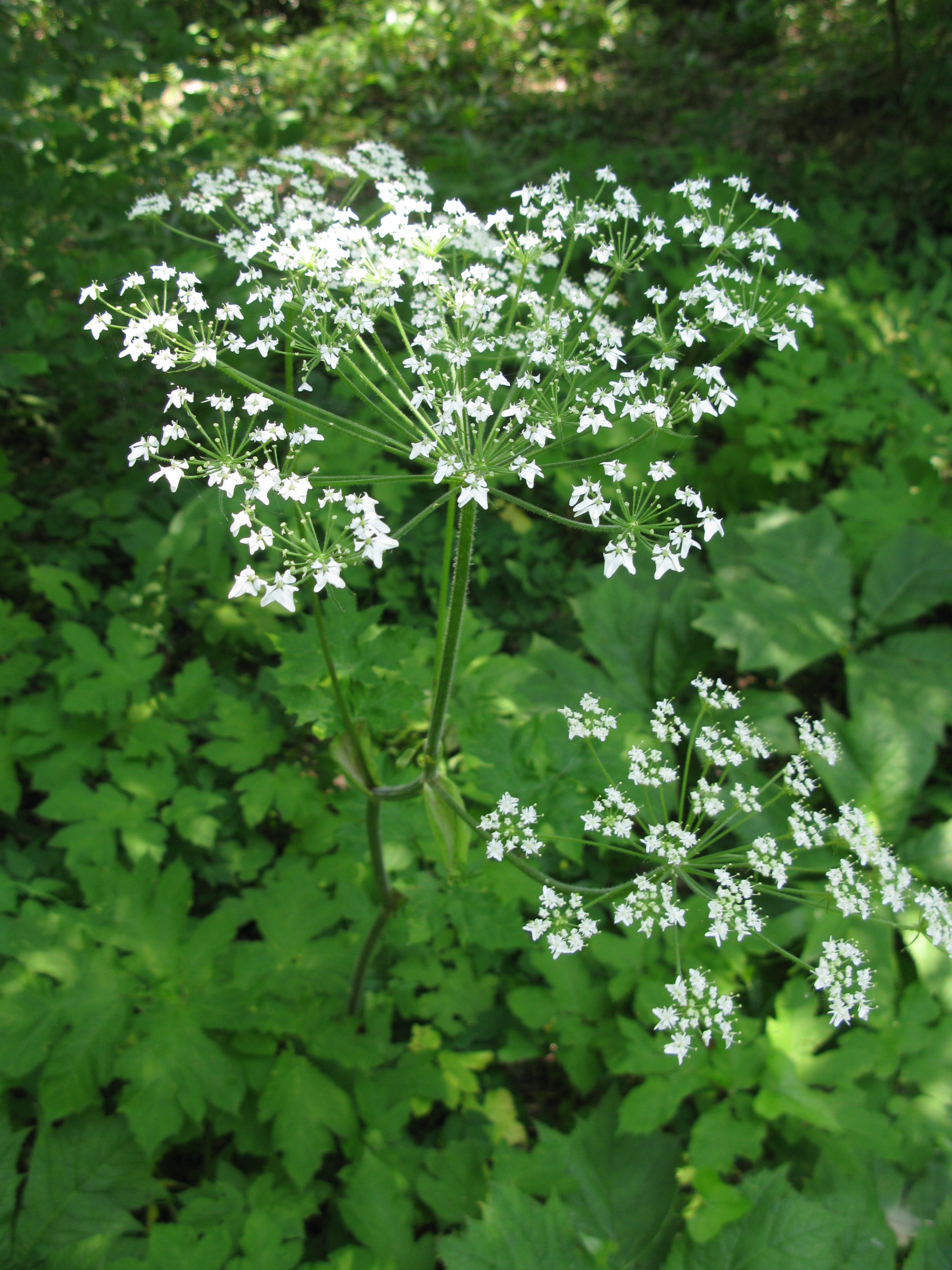

Scientific classification
- Kingdom: Plantae
- Clade: Tracheophytes
- Clade: Angiosperms
- Clade: Eudicots
- Clade: Asterids
- Order: Apiales
- Family: Apiaceae
- Genus: Heracleum
- Species: H. sphondylium
- Variety: H. s. var. nipponicum

Trinomial name
- Heracleum sphondylium var. nipponicum (Kitag.) H.Ohba

= Heracleum sphondylium var. nipponicum =

Variety of flowering plant

Heracleum sphondylium var. nipponicum is a perennial plant that is a variety of Heracleum sphondylium native to Japan. Plants of the World Online lists it as a synonym of Heracleum moellendorffii var. moellendorffii.

== Description ==
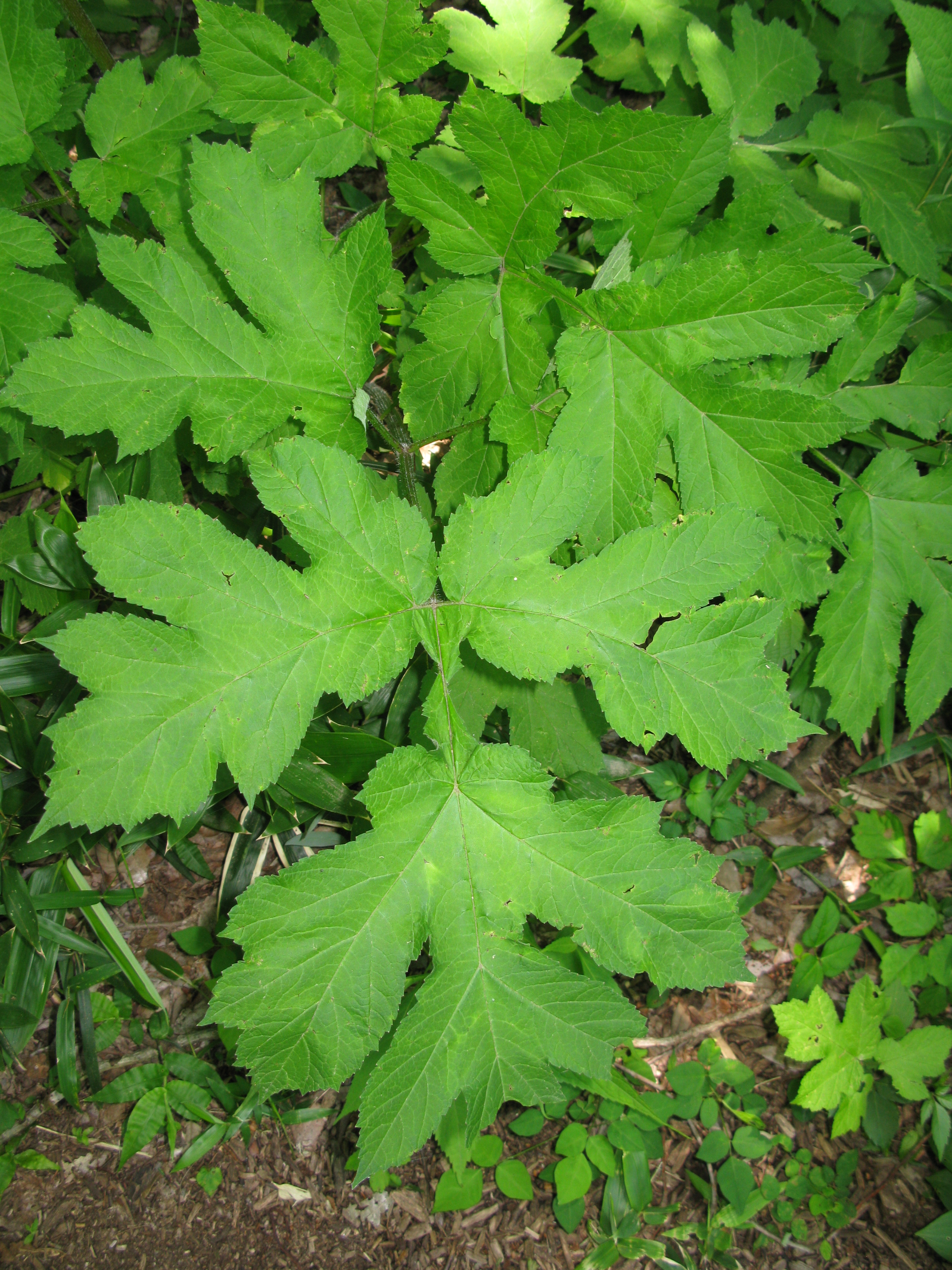
Leaf

It grows from 70 to 200 centimetres (28 to 79 in) tall and it flowers from May to June. The leaves are 5 to 15 centimetres (2.0 to 5.9 in) long, 4 to 15 centimetres (1.6 to 5.9 in) wide and the flowers are white.
