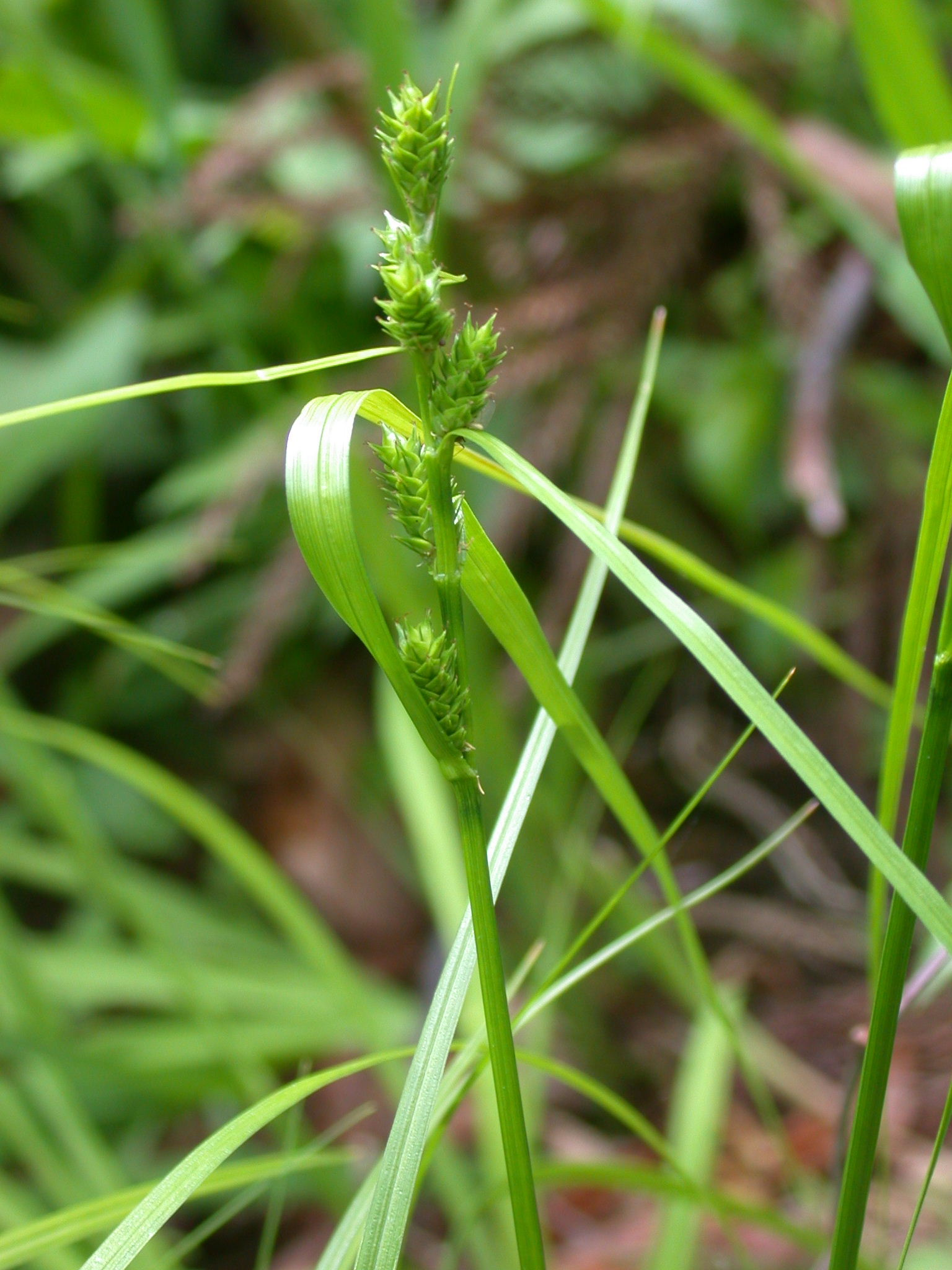
- Close-up of spike
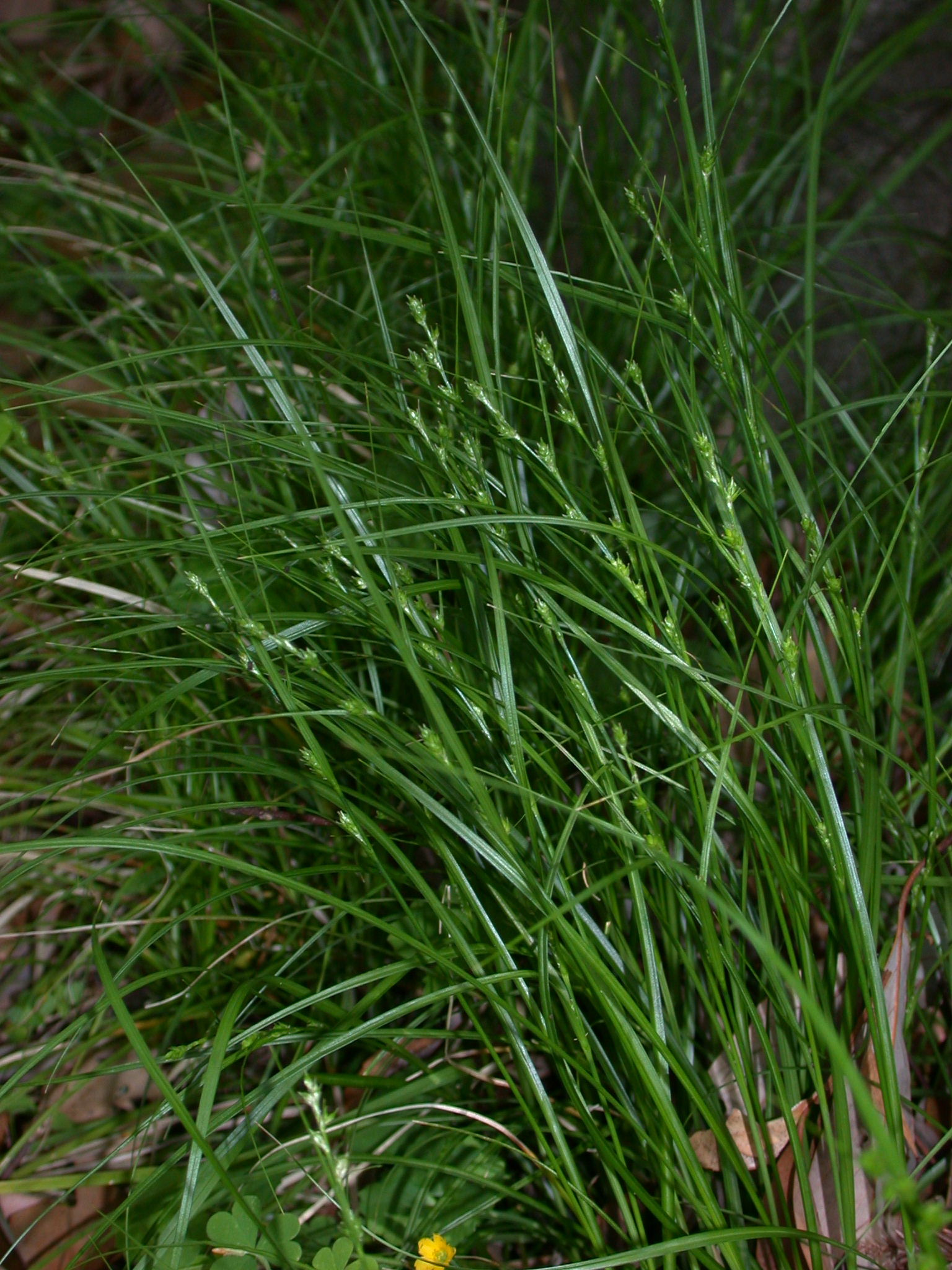
- Habit

Scientific classification
- Kingdom: Plantae
- Clade: Tracheophytes
- Clade: Angiosperms
- Clade: Monocots
- Clade: Commelinids
- Order: Poales
- Family: Cyperaceae
- Genus: Carex
- Species: C. gibba

Binomial name
- Carex gibba Wahlenb.

Synonyms
- Carex alta var. brevior H.Lév. & Vaniot; Carex anomala Boott; Carex leucocarpa Boeckeler; Carex pteroloma Kunze ex Steud.

= Carex gibba =

Species of grass-like plant

Carex gibba is a species of true sedge in the family Cyperaceae, native to Vietnam, southern and central China, Manchuria, the Korean Peninsula, and Japan. It is basal in its subgenus Vignea.
