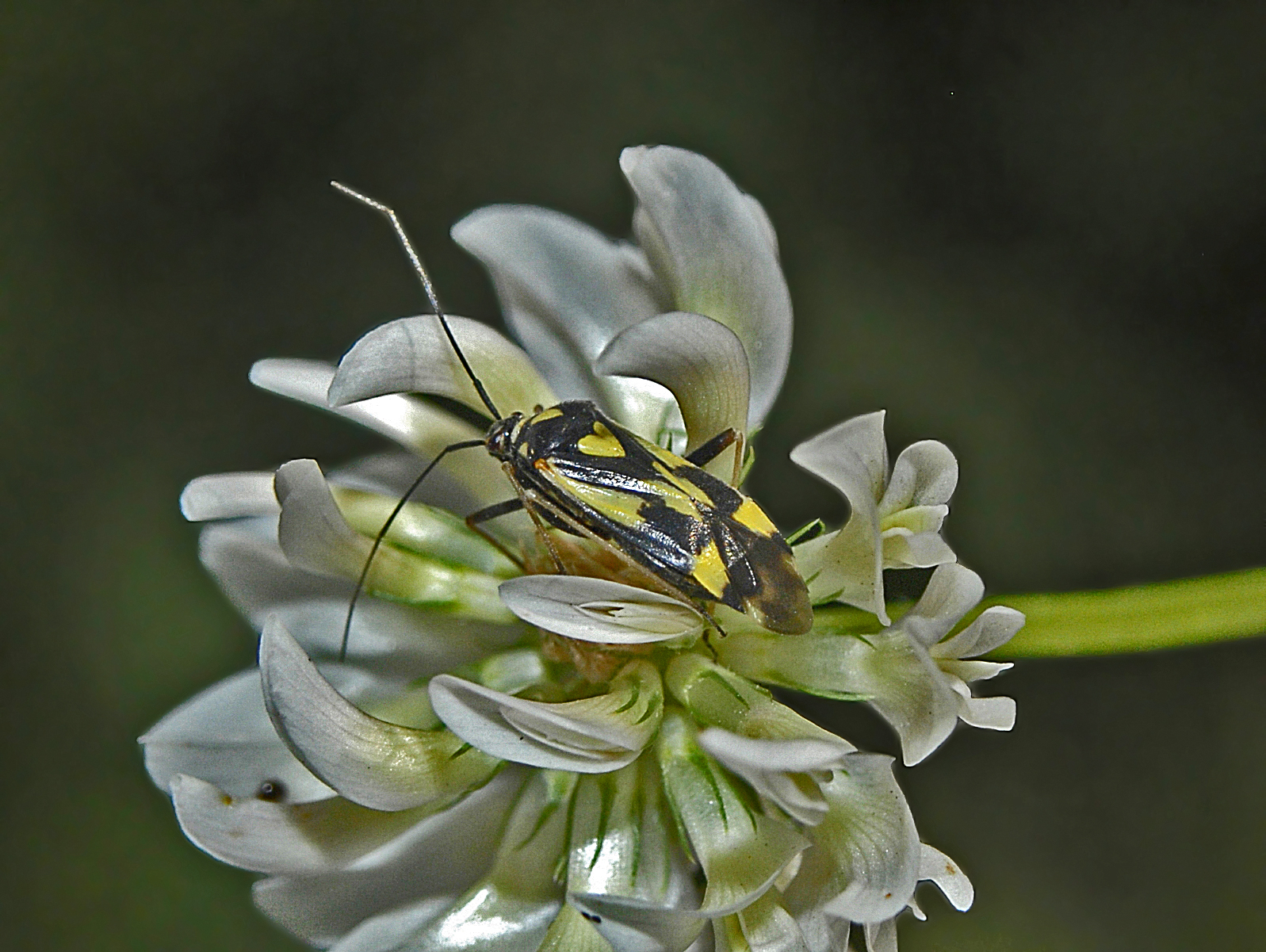
- Grypocoris sexguttatus

Scientific classification
- Kingdom: Animalia
- Phylum: Arthropoda
- Class: Insecta
- Order: Hemiptera
- Suborder: Heteroptera
- Family: Miridae
- Tribe: Mirini
- Genus: Grypocoris; Douglas & Scott, 1868

= Grypocoris =

Genus of true bugs

Grypocoris is a genus of true bugs belonging to the family Miridae or plant bugs, subfamily Mirinae.

== Species ==
- Grypocoris melanopygus (Horvath, 1905)
- Grypocoris sexguttatus (Fabricius, 1777)
- Grypocoris stysi (Wagner, 1968)
