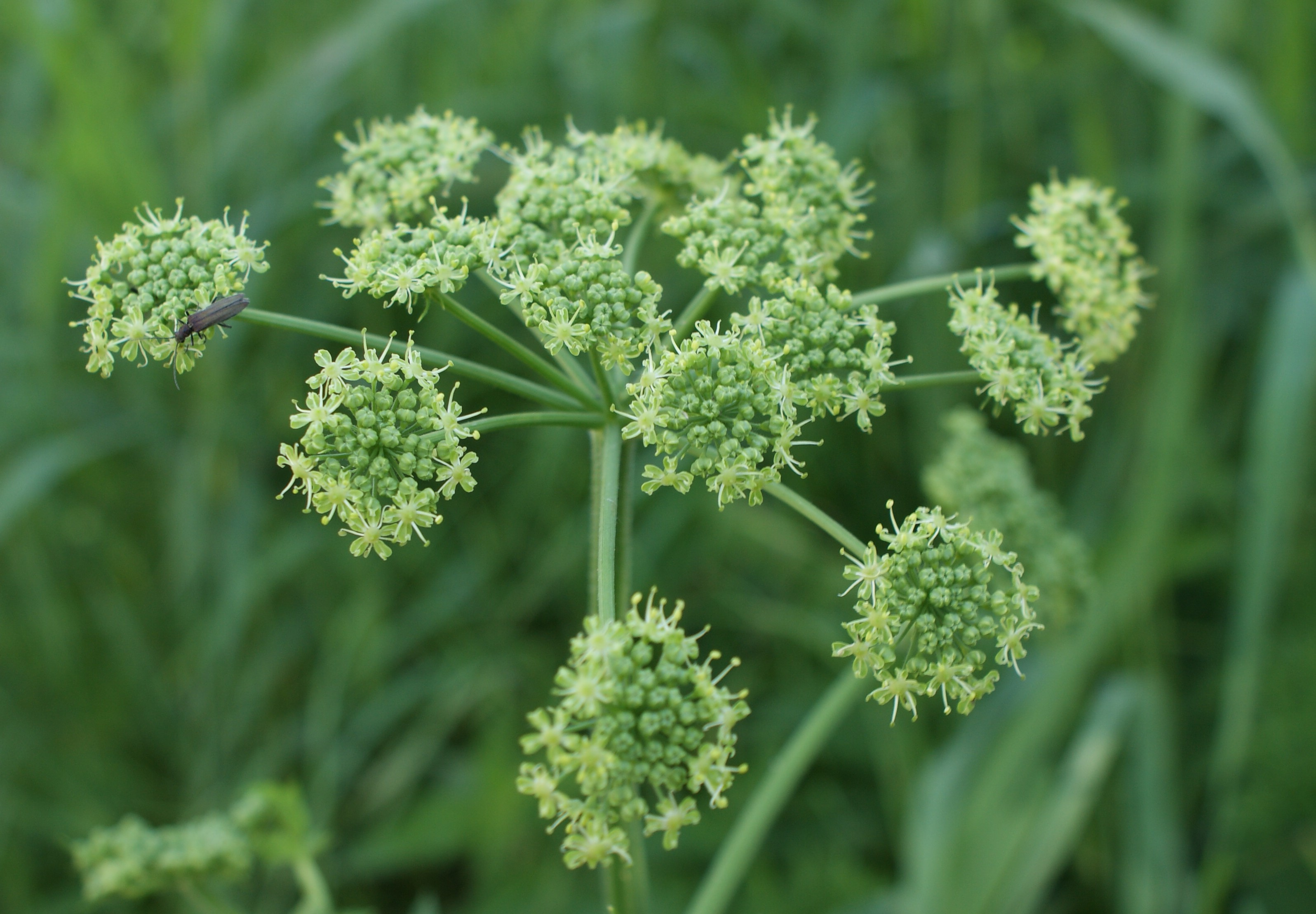

Scientific classification
- Kingdom: Plantae
- Clade: Tracheophytes
- Clade: Angiosperms
- Clade: Eudicots
- Clade: Asterids
- Order: Apiales
- Family: Apiaceae
- Genus: Heracleum
- Species: H. sibiricum

Binomial name
- Heracleum sibiricum L.

Synonyms
- Homotypic synonyms: Heracleum sphondylium subsp. sibiricum (L.) Simonk.; Pastinaca sibirica (L.) Calest.; Heterotypic synonyms: Heracleum angustifolium L.; Heracleum bifarium Fisch. ex Rchb.; Heracleum flavescens Willd.; Heracleum flavescens Baumg.; Heracleum flavescens Besser; Heracleum flavescens var. latifolium DC.; Heracleum lecoqii Godr.; Heracleum lecoquii Martrin-Donos; Heracleum sibiricum var. angustifolium Rupr.; Heracleum sibiricum f. angustisectum Gawł.; Heracleum sibiricum f. angustissimum (Wohlf.) Gawł.; Heracleum sibiricum var. chaetocarpum Neumayer & Thell.; Heracleum sibiricum subsp. glabrum (Huth) Briq.; Heracleum sibiricum f. latifolium (DC.) Reduron; Heracleum sibiricum subsp. lecoqii (Godr.) Nyman; Heracleum sibiricum proles lecoqii (Godr.) Rouy & E.G.Camus; Heracleum sibiricum var. longifolium Rupr.; Heracleum sibiricum f. rarum Gawł.; Heracleum sibiricum f. varbossanium (K.Malý) Gawł.; Heracleum sphondylium f. angustissimum Wohlf.; Heracleum sphondylium subsp. flavescens (Willd.) Soó; Heracleum sphondylium var. glabrum Huth; Heracleum sphondylium subsp. glabrum (Huth) Holub; Heracleum sphondylium f. involucratum K.Malý; Heracleum sphondylium var. rarum (Gawł.) Soó; Heracleum sphondylium lusus varbossanium K.Malý; Selinum casparyi E.H.L.Krause

= Heracleum sibiricum =

Species of flowering plant

Heracleum sibiricum is a species of flowering plant in the family Apiaceae. It is native to Europe and western Asia, ranging from France and Italy to western Siberia and Mongolia.

== Description ==
Heracleum sibiricum is a herbaceous, perennial, flowering plant with flowers arranged in an umbel. Each flower has five yellowish-green petals. Individual flowers may be bisexual (with a pistil and five stamens), pistillate (with no functional stamens), or staminate (with no functioning pistil). The pistil is bicarpellate and syncarpous, that is, it has two carpels fused together. The ovary is glabrous (hairless) and the stylopodium (at the base of the styles) is almost always green. The fruit is composed of two mericarps, each with a single seed.

=== Similar species ===
Heracleum sibiricum is similar in appearance to Heracleum sphondylium, a very close relative. The following table emphasizes the differences between the two species:

	Heracleum sphondylium	Heracleum sibiricum
Flower color	White, rarely yellowish, greenish, or pink	Greenish-yellow or greenish, never white
Floral symmetry	The outer petals of the marginal flowers of a secondary umbel are enlarged, often two or more times longer than the inner petals; the outer petals are deeply incised at apex	The outer petals of the marginal flowers of a secondary umbel are not enlarged or only very slightly enlarged; the outer petals are either not incised at the apex or only slightly incised
Ovary	Overgrown with soft, spreading hairs with blunt tips	Glabrous
Stylopodium	Almost always whitish	Almost always greenish

The marginal flowers of Heracleum sphondylium are typically zygomorphic (with bilateral symmetry), whereas the marginal flowers of Heracleum sibiricum are actinomorphic (with radial symmetry) or nearly so. Occasionally the marginal flowers of Heracleum sphondylium will be actinomorphic, however.

Both species are variable with respect to the pilosity (hairiness) of the ovary. An atypical form of Heracleum sphondylium may appear to be glabrous to the naked eye but in fact it has short, stiff, ascending hairs with pointy tips. An atypical form of Heracleum sibiricum has similar but even shorter hairs.

== Taxonomy ==
Heracleum sibiricum is one of five species of Heracleum described by the Swedish botanist Carl Linnaeus in 1753 (the other four being H. alpinum, H. austriacum, H. panaces, and H. sphondylium). The specific name sibiricum suggests the taxon occurs in Siberia, a fact mentioned by Linnaeus in his description. In 1887, the Hungarian botanist Lajos Simonkai reduced its taxonomic rank to a subspecies of Heracleum sphondylium. As of August 2023, Plants of the World Online (and a few other authorities) accept Heracleum sibiricum L., but most authorities still recognize Heracleum sphondylium subsp. sibiricum (L.) Simonk.

In 1926, the Swiss botanist Albert Thellung described Heracleum sphondylium var. chaetocarpum, a variety of Heracleum sibiricum. Thellung described the taxon as a variety of Heracleum sphondylium (not Heracleum sibiricum) since he recognized Heracleum sphondylium subsp. sibiricum (L.) Simonk. (not Heracleum sibiricum L.). The typical form of Heracleum sibiricum has a glabrous ovary, whereas that of var. chaetocarpum has short, stiff, ascending hairs with pointy tips. The hairs are so short and sparse, they may not be visible to the naked eye. In 1961, the Polish botanist Maria Gawłowska described Heracleum sibiricum f. rarum, a form of var. chaetocarpum with elongated leaf lobes.

== Distribution and habitat ==
Heracleum sibiricum is native to Europe and western Asia, ranging from France and Italy to western Siberia and Mongolia. For example, it occurs in northern and northeastern Poland but much less so in other parts of the country. Some authors claim its native range extends into Great Britain, while other sources suggest the taxon has been introduced in Britain. Authorities claim the taxon is widely introduced throughout North America, but as of August 2023, the presence of Heracleum sibiricum in eastern Canada and New England has not been confirmed. It has been also introduced into Primorye, Yukon, Khabarovsk, Irkutsk, New Jersey and Buryatia.

== Ecology ==
Heracleum sibiricum is most commonly a polycarpic perennial (not a biennial as often claimed), but approximately one-fourth of individuals are monocarpic. On average, first flowering requires 6–7 years of vegetative growth and may be delayed for up to 10 years. Although two or three (up to eight) subsequent flowerings are expected, most individuals do not flower in successive seasons. Estimates of average life span range from 12 to 16 years with a maximum age of 25 years.

== Conservation ==
As of August 2023, the global conservation status of Heracleum sphondylium subsp. sibiricum (a synonym for Heracleum sibiricum) is unranked.

== Bibliography ==
- Gawłowska, Maria J. (1957). "Research on the distribution of Heracleum sphondylium L. and Heracleum sibiricum L. in Poland". Fragmenta Floristica et Geobotanica. 3 (1): 61–68.
- Gawłowska, Maria J. (1961). "Taxonomy of the species Heracleum sphondylium L. and Heracleum sibiricum L. occurring in Poland and neighbouring countries". Fragmenta Floristica et Geobotanica. 7 (1): 3–39.
- Gilman, Arthur V. (2015). New Flora of Vermont. Memoirs of The New York Botanical Garden, Volume 110. Bronx, New York, USA: The New York Botanical Garden Press. ISBN 978-0-89327-516-7.
- Haines, Arthur (2011). New England Wild Flower Society's Flora Novae Angliae: A Manual for the Identification of Native and Naturalized Higher Vascular Plants of New England. Illustrated by Elizabeth Farnsworth and Gordon Morrison. Yale University Press. ISBN 978-0-300-17154-9.
- Linnaeus, Carl (1753). Species Plantarum: exhibentes plantas rite cognitas, ad genera relatas, cum differentiis specificis, nominibus trivialibus, synonymis selectis, locis natalibus, secundum systema sexuale digestas (1st ed.). Stockholm: Impensis Laurentii Salvii.
- Sheppard, A. W. (March 1991). "Heracleum sphondylium L.". Journal of Ecology. 79 (1): 235–258. doi:10.2307/2260795. JSTOR 2260795.
- Simonkai, Lajos (1887). Enumeratio Florae Transsilvanicae. Budapest: Kir. Magyar Természettudományi Társulat. p. 266.
- Zych, Marcin (2006). "On flower visitors and true pollinators: The case of protandrous Heracleum sphondylium L. (Apiaceae)" (PDF). Plant Systematics and Evolution. 263 (3–4): 159–179. doi:10.1007/s00606-006-0493-y. S2CID 40995627. Archived from the original (PDF) on 10 August 2023.
