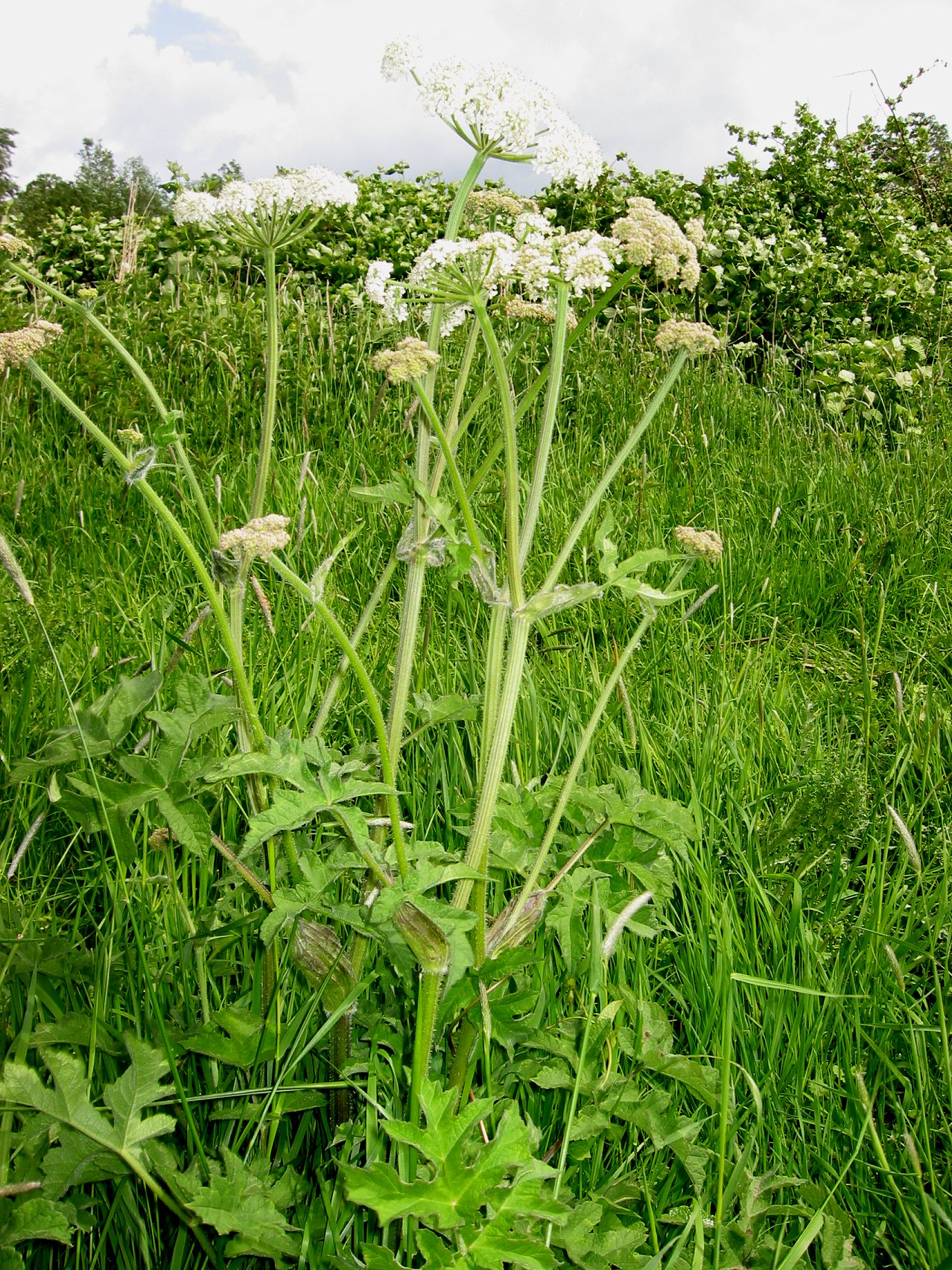

Scientific classification
- Kingdom: Plantae
- Clade: Tracheophytes
- Clade: Angiosperms
- Clade: Eudicots
- Clade: Asterids
- Order: Apiales
- Family: Apiaceae
- Genus: Heracleum
- Species: H. sphondylium

Binomial name
- Heracleum sphondylium L.

Synonyms
- Homotypic synonyms: Pastinaca sphondylium (L.) Calest.; Sphondylium vulgare Gray; Heterotypic synonyms: Heracleum australe f. wendtioides Murb.; Heracleum sphondylium var. macrocarpum Lange

= Heracleum sphondylium =

Species of flowering plant in the celery family

Heracleum sphondylium, commonly known as hogweed or common hogweed, is a herbaceous perennial plant in the carrot family Apiaceae, which includes fennel, cow parsley, ground elder and giant hogweed. It is native to most of Europe, western Asia and northern Africa, but is introduced in North America and elsewhere. Other common names include cow parsnip (not to be confused with Heracleum maximum of North America). The flowers provide a great deal of nectar for pollinators.

== Description ==
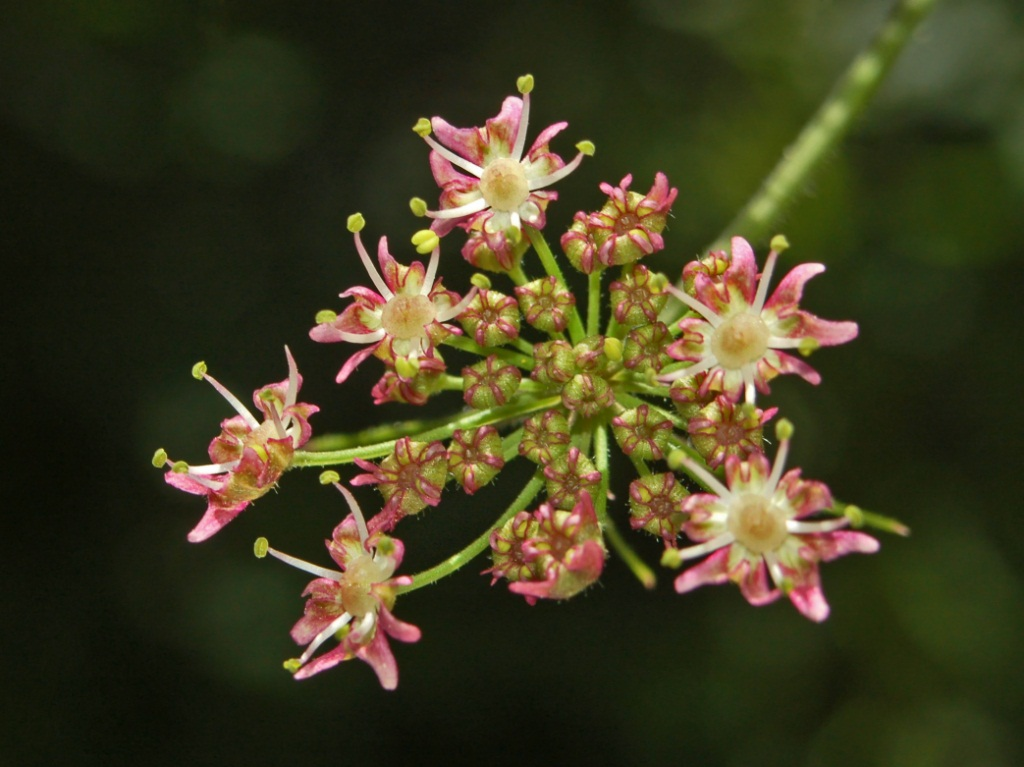
Close-up of H. sphondylium flowers

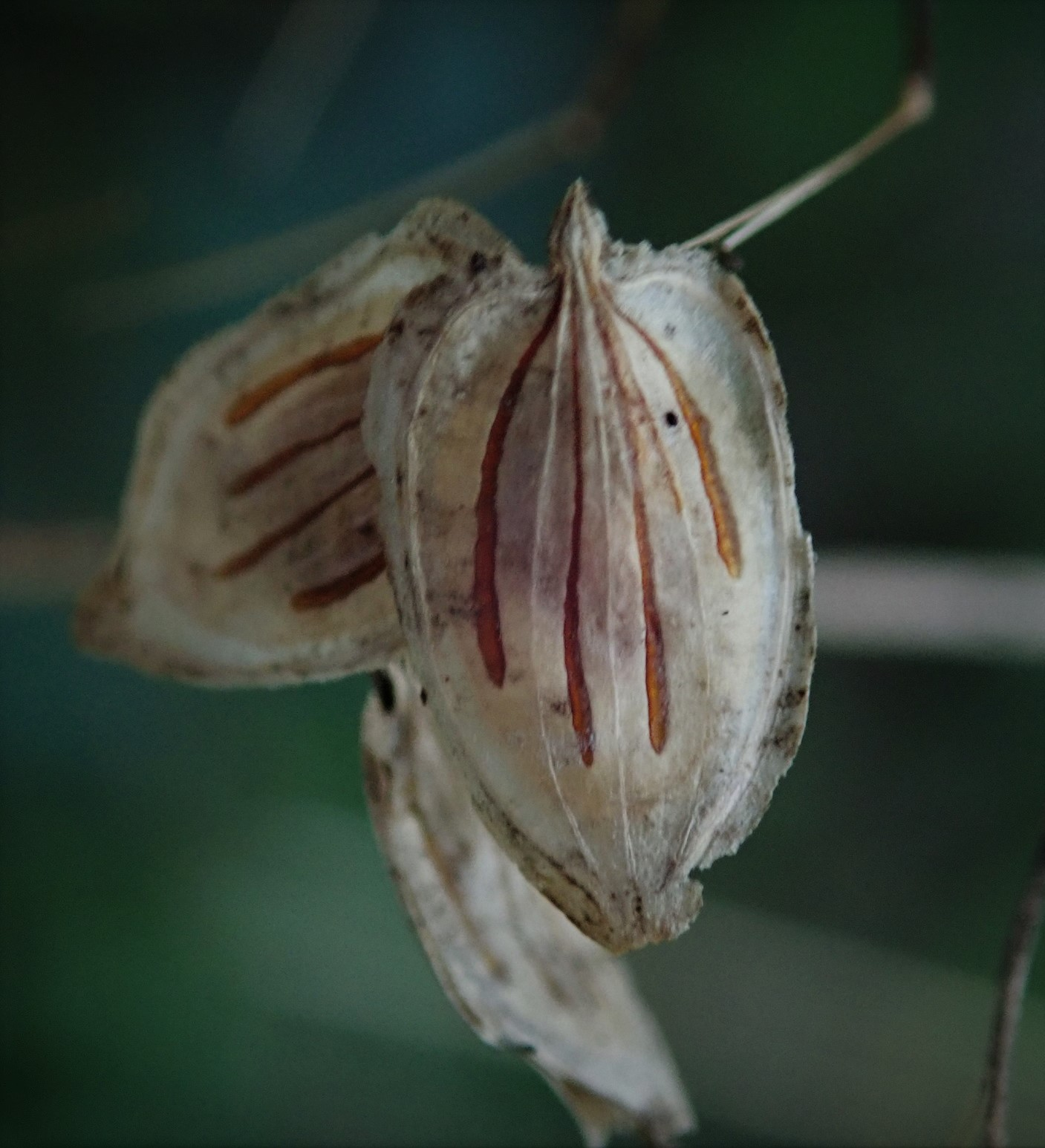
Heracleum sphondylium fruit

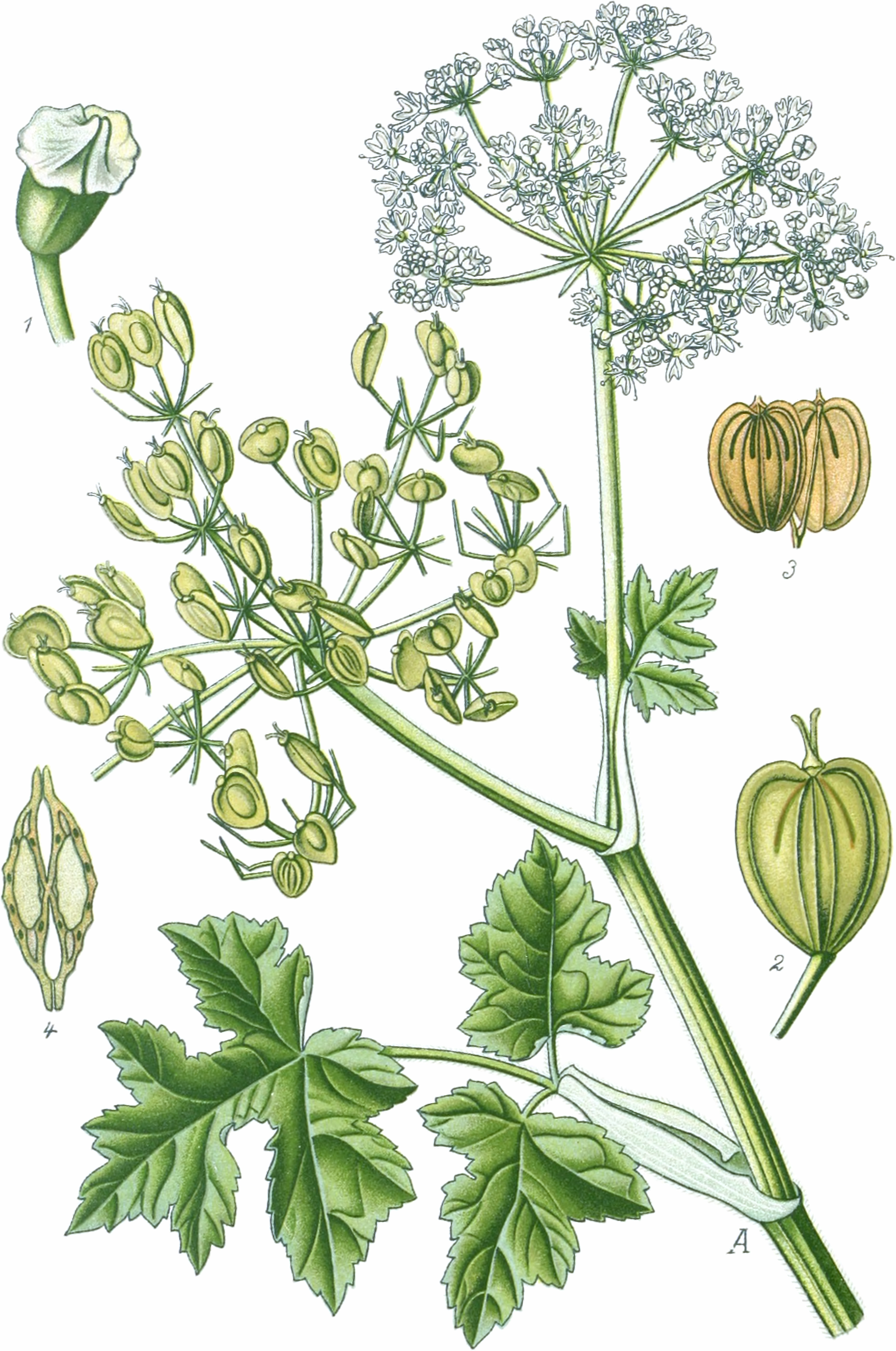
Drawing of Heracleum sphondylium, showing the heart-shaped schizocarp (fruit)

Heracleum sphondylium is a herbaceous, flowering plant. It is a tall, roughly hairy plant reaching up to 2 metres (6 ft 7 in) in height. The hollow, ridged stem with bristly hairs arises from a large tap root. The leaves can reach 50 centimetres (20 in) in length. They are once or twice pinnate, hairy and serrated, divided into 3–5 lobed segments.

Heracleum sphondylium is most commonly a polycarpic perennial plant, not a biennial as sometimes claimed. The flowers are arranged in umbels, either flat or slightly convex, 4–25 cm (1.6–9.8 in) in diameter, usually with 10–25 hairy, somewhat unequal rays, each 2–12 cm (0.8–4.7 in) long. Each flower has five white or rarely pinkish-white to purplish petals. The central flowers of the umbel have radial symmetry (actinomorphic), while the flowers around the perimeter of the umbel have bilateral symmetry (zygomorphic) since the outermost petals are enlarged. The winged fruits are flattened schizocarps, elliptical to rounded and glabrous, about 7–12 mm long.

The characteristic 'farm yardy' smell or the observation that pigs would eat the foliage and roots of hogweed is perhaps the origin of its common name.

Heracleum sphondylium is smaller than Heracleum mantegazzianum (giant hogweed) and Heracleum sosnowskyi (Sosnowsky's hogweed). It contains some of the same phytophototoxic compounds (furanocoumarins), albeit at much lower concentrations, and there is evidence that the sap from common hogweed can also produce phytophotodermatitis (burns and rashes) in sensitive individuals when contaminated skin is exposed to sunlight.

=== Similar species ===
Heracleum sphondylium is often confused with Heracleum sibiricum, also known as Heracleum sphondylium subsp. sibiricum. The latter is similar to the typical subsp. sphondylium except that it has yellowish-green flowers that are actinomorphic throughout the umbel arrangement.

== Taxonomy ==
Heracleum sphondylium is one of five species of Heracleum described by the Swedish botanist Carl Linnaeus in 1753 (the other four being H. alpinum, H. austriacum, H. panaces, and H. sibiricum).

=== Subspecies ===
Since the morphology of Heracleum sphondylium is highly variable throughout its range, many infraspecific taxa have been described. In 1968, Flora Europaea accepts 8 subspecies in addition to the nominate subspecies. As of September 2023, World Flora Online (WFO) and Plants of the World Online (POWO) accept 18 and 14 subspecies, respectively.

	Flora Europaea	WFO	POWO
H. s. subsp. algeriense (Coss. ex Batt. & Trab.) Dobignard		Yes	Yes
H. s. subsp. alpinum (L.) Bonnier & Layens	Yes	Yes	Yes
H. s. subsp. artvinense (Manden.) P.H.Davis		Yes	Yes
H. s. subsp. aurasiacum (Maire) Dobignard		Yes	Yes
H. s. subsp. carpaticum (Porcius) Soó		Yes	
H. s. subsp. cyclocarpum (K.Koch) P.H.Davis		Yes	
H. s. subsp. elegans (Crantz) Schübl. & G.Martens			Yes
H. s. subsp. embergeri Maire		Yes	Yes
H. s. subsp. flavescens (Willd.) Soó		Yes	
H. s. subsp. granatense (Boiss.) Briq.		Yes	Yes
H. s. subsp. montanum (Schleich. ex Gaudin) Briq.	Yes	Yes	
H. s. subsp. orsinii (Guss.) H.Neumayer	Yes	Yes	Yes
H. s. subsp. pyrenaicum (Lam.) Bonnier & Layens	Yes	Yes	Yes
H. s. subsp. sibiricum (L.) Simonk.	Yes	Yes	
H. s. subsp. suaveolens (Litard. & Maire) Dobignard		Yes	Yes
H. s. subsp. ternatum (Velen.) Brummitt	Yes	Yes	Yes
H. s. subsp. transsilvanicum (Schur) Brummitt	Yes	Yes	Yes
H. s. subsp. trifoliolatum (Blanch.) Kerguélen		Yes	Yes
H. s. subsp. verticillatum (Pančić) Brummitt	Yes	Yes	Yes

Unlike WFO, POWO recognizes subsp. carpaticum, subsp. cyclocarpum, and subsp. sibiricum at species rank, with subsp. flavescens being a synonym of Heracleum sibiricum. In 1971, Brummitt lumped Heracleum lanatum Michx. of North America into subsp. montanum of Europe. As of October 2023, POWO accepts these taxa as Heracleum maximum W.Bartram and subsp. elegans, respectively.

=== Other infraspecies ===
The marginal flowers of Heracleum sphondylium subsp. sphondylium are typically zygomorphic, that is, the outer petals of the marginal flowers of a secondary umbel are markedly larger, often two or more times as large as the inner petals. In 1846, the German botanist Wilhelm Ludwig Petermann described an infraspecies of subsp. sphondylium that lacks this characteristic. Subsequently, various authors have referred to it as f. subregulare or var. subregulare, but the correct name of the infraspecies is Heracleum sphondylium var. subregulare Peterm. The epithet subregulare means "almost regular", a reference to the atypical marginal flowers of the variety.

In 1961, the Polish botanist Maria J. Gawłowska constructed the following taxonomy for Heracleum sphondylium:

- Heracleum sphondylium var. sphondylium
  - Heracleum sphondylium f. stenophyllum (Gaudin) Gawł.
  - Heracleum sphondylium f. dissectum (Le Gall) Gawł.
  - Heracleum sphondylium f. subregulare Peterm.
  - Heracleum sphondylium f. subaequale Gawł.
- Heracleum sphondylium var. chaetocarpoides Gawł.
  - Heracleum sphondylium f. spectabile Gawł.
  - Heracleum sphondylium f. mirabile Gawł.
  - Heracleum sphondylium f. intermedium Gawł.
  - Heracleum sphondylium f. commutatum Gawł.

The typical variety of Heracleum sphondylium subsp. sphondylium is there designated as Heracleum sphondylium var. sphondylium. It is distinguished from var. chaetocarpoides by the pilosity (hairiness) of the ovary. Each of the listed forms differs from its corresponding variety with respect to floral symmetry or leaf morphology, or both.

Neither f. stenophyllum nor f. dissectum are validly published names since Gawłowska did not properly specify the basionym in each case. The name f. subregulare is not a correct name (see above). The remaining names are validly published. According to Plants of the World Online, each of the names in the previous list is a synonym for Heracleum sphondylium subsp. sphondylium.

Based on Gawłowska's taxonomy, var. sphondylium (along with each of its four forms) has an ovary overgrown with soft, blunt, spreading hairs whereas the ovary of var. chaetocarpoides (and each of its four forms) has short, stiff, ascending hairs with pointy tips. The hairs of var. chaetocarpoides may be so short, they may not be visible to the naked eye.

Half of the forms lack the typical floral symmetry of the other forms. Similar to Petermann's subregulare, the marginal flowers of f. subaequale, f. intermedium, and f. commutatum are nearly actinomorphic, that is, the outer petals of the marginal flowers of a secondary umbel are only slightly enlarged, and either slightly incised at the apex or not incised at all. Only var. chaetocarpoides and its form f. intermedium were found to be common in Poland in 1961.

As of August 2023, other infraspecific names are in use:

	Tropicos	WFO
H. s. var. akasimontanum (Koidz.) H. Ohba	Yes	
H. s. var. angustifolium Jacq.	Yes	
H. s. var. fontqueri O.Bolòs & Vigo		Yes
H. s. var. lanatum (Michx.) Dorn	Yes	
H. s. var. nipponicum (Kitag.) H. Ohba	Yes	
H. s. var. rarum (Gawlowska) Soó		Yes
H. s. var. tsaurugisanense (Honda) H. Ohba	Yes	
H. s. f. atropurpureum (F.Malý) Nikolic		Yes
H. s. f. dissectum H.Ohba	Yes	Yes
H. s. f. rubriflorum H.Ohba	Yes	Yes

=== Etymology ===
The species name sphondylium, meaning "vertebrate" (from Greek σπόνδυλος, spondylos 'vertebra') refers to the shape of the segmented stem.

== Distribution and habitat ==
Heracleum sphondylium is native to most of Europe, western Asia and northern Africa. For example, it occurs in southern and southwestern Poland but much less so in other parts of the country. The species has been introduced into North America. In particular, it has been introduced to eastern Canada, but reports of H. sphondylium in Canada are rare. Some authorities claim that Heracleum sphondylium subsp. sibiricum (a synonym of Heracleum sibiricum) has been introduced in the United States, but in New England, botanists have been unable to identify the taxon to subspecies rank.

The plant is common in grassland, herb-rich meadows, in hedges, meadows and woods, road verges and railway embankments, waste and cultivated ground. It grows especially well on moist, improved nitrogen-rich soils. It can occur in mountain areas up to 2,500 m (8,200 ft) of altitude.

== Ecology ==
In Europe, the primary flowering season of Heracleum sphondylium subsp. sphondylium extends from June to September, with peak flowering and seed ripening occurring in July and August, respectively. In Great Britain, seed dispersal occurs during late September and early October, which usually coincides with the winds of the September equinox.

The flowers are pollinated by insects such as beetles, wasps and especially flies. As its name suggests, the small picture-winged fly Euleia heraclei is found on hogweed. The leaves are commonly mined by the larvae of the leaf miner Phytomyza spondylii.

Heracleum sphondylium was rated in the top 10 for most nectar production (nectar per unit cover per year) in a UK plants survey conducted by AgriLand, a project supported by the UK Insect Pollinators Initiative.

== Uses ==
Borscht derives from an ancient soup originally cooked from pickled stems, leaves and umbels of common hogweed. The young shoots are considered excellent eating by many foragers.

In eastern European countries and especially Romania, H. sphondylium is used as an aphrodisiac and to treat gynecological and fertility problems and impotence. It is also sometimes recommended for epilepsy. However, there are no clinical studies to prove its efficacy at treating any of these problems.

The seeds can be dried and used as a spice, with a flavour similar to that of cardamom.

== Bibliography ==
- Brummitt, R. K. (December 1971). "Relationship of Heracleum lanatum Michx. of North America to H. sphondylium of Europe". Rhodora. 73 (796): 578–584. JSTOR 23311734.
- Gawłowska, Maria J. (1957). "Research on the distribution of Heracleum sphondylium L. and Heracleum sibiricum L. in Poland". Fragmenta Floristica et Geobotanica. 3 (1): 61–68.
- Gawłowska, Maria J. (1961). "Taxonomy of the species Heracleum sphondylium L. and Heracleum sibiricum L. occurring in Poland and neighbouring countries". Fragmenta Floristica et Geobotanica. 7 (1): 3–39.
- Gilman, Arthur V. (2015). New Flora of Vermont. Memoirs of The New York Botanical Garden, Volume 110. Bronx, New York, USA: The New York Botanical Garden Press. ISBN 978-0-89327-516-7.
- Haines, Arthur (2011). New England Wild Flower Society's Flora Novae Angliae: A Manual for the Identification of Native and Naturalized Higher Vascular Plants of New England. Illustrated by Elizabeth Farnsworth and Gordon Morrison. Yale University Press. ISBN 978-0-300-17154-9.
- Linnaeus, Carl (1753). Species Plantarum: exhibentes plantas rite cognitas, ad genera relatas, cum differentiis specificis, nominibus trivialibus, synonymis selectis, locis natalibus, secundum systema sexuale digestas (1st ed.). Stockholm: Impensis Laurentii Salvii.
- Sheppard, A. W. (March 1991). "Heracleum sphondylium L.". Journal of Ecology. 79 (1): 235–258. doi:10.2307/2260795. JSTOR 2260795.
- Tutin, T. G.; Heywood, V. H.; Burges, N. A.; Valentine, D. H.; Walters, S. M.; Webb, D. A., eds. (1968). Flora Europaea. Vol. 2. Cambridge University Press. ISBN 0-521-06662-X.
- Zych, Marcin (2006). "On flower visitors and true pollinators: The case of protandrous Heracleum sphondylium L. (Apiaceae)" (PDF). Plant Systematics and Evolution. 263 (3–4): 159–179. doi:10.1007/s00606-006-0493-y. S2CID 40995627. Archived from the original (PDF) on 10 August 2023.
