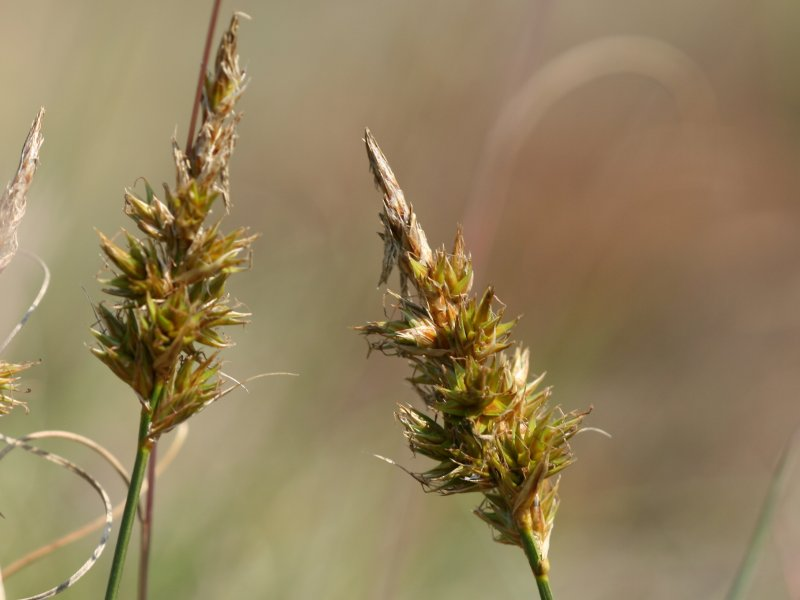
- Inflorescences of Carex arenaria

Scientific classification
- Kingdom: Plantae
- Clade: Tracheophytes
- Clade: Angiosperms
- Clade: Monocots
- Clade: Commelinids
- Order: Poales
- Family: Cyperaceae
- Genus: Carex
- Subgenus: Carex subg. Vignea (P. Beauv. ex T. Lestib.) Peterm.

Type species
- Carex arenaria L.

= Carex subg. Vignea =

Subgenus of sedges

Carex subg. Vignea is a subgenus of the sedge genus Carex, containing around 300 of the 2000 species in the genus. Its members are characterised by having bisexual, sessile spikes, where the female flowers have two stigmas each.

Carex subg. Vignea has been repeatedly found to be monophyletic in molecular phylogenetic analysis, with Carex gibba (which, exceptionally for the section, has three stigmas per female flower) as the sister group to the rest of the subgenus. It contains the following sections:

- Carex sect. Ammoglochin
- Carex sect. Baldenses
- Carex sect. Bracteosae
- Carex sect. Chordorrhizae
- Carex sect. Deweyanae
- Carex sect. Dispermae
- Carex sect. Divisae
- Carex sect. Echinochloomorphae
- Carex sect. Foetidae
- Carex sect. Gibbae
- Carex sect. Glareosae
- Carex sect. Grallatoriae
- Carex sect. Heleoglochin
- Carex sect. Holarrhenae
- Carex sect. Incurvae
- Carex sect. Inversae
- Carex sect. Macrocephalae
- Carex sect. Multiflorae
- Carex sect. Ovales
- Carex sect. Phaestoglochin
- Carex sect. Phleoideae
- Carex sect. Physodeae
- Carex sect. Physoglochin
- Carex sect. Potosinae
- Carex sect. Remotae
- Carex sect. Stellulatae
- Carex sect. Stenorhynchae
- Carex sect. Thomsonianae
- Carex sect. Vulpinae

== See also ==
- List of Carex species
