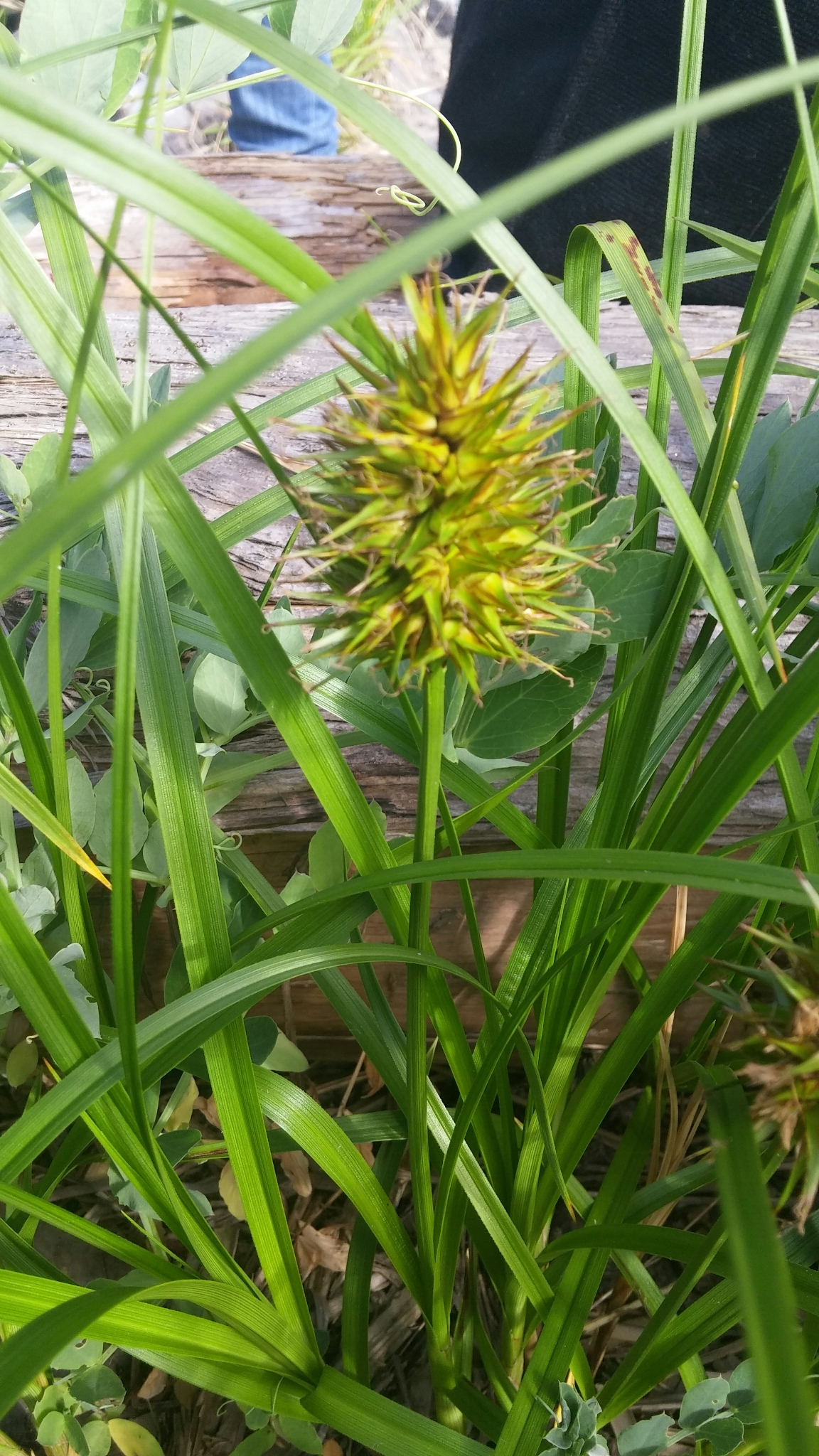
- At the Pacific Spirit Regional Park
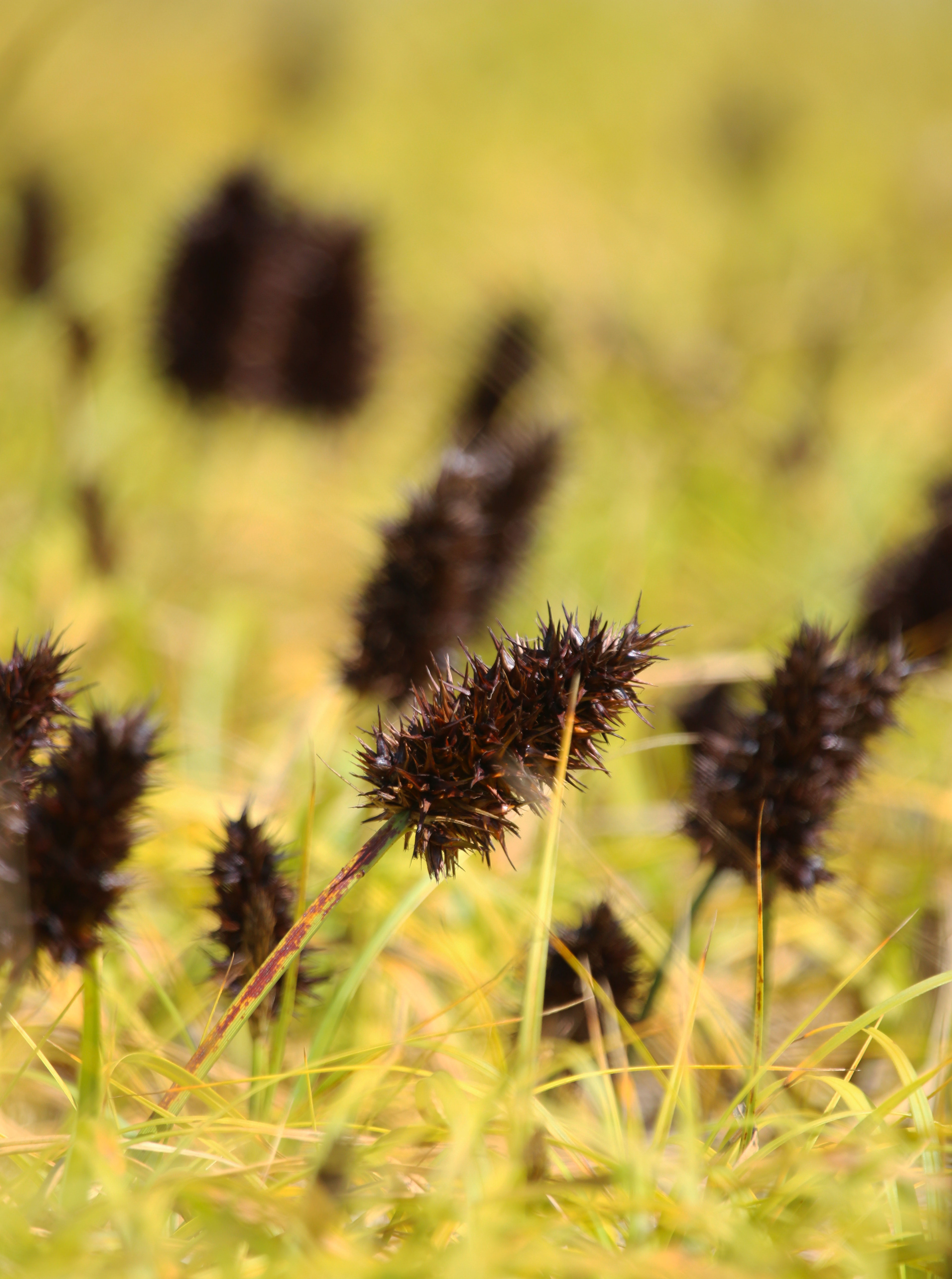
- Peter Pearsall/U.S. Fish and Wildlife Service

Scientific classification
- Kingdom: Plantae
- Clade: Tracheophytes
- Clade: Angiosperms
- Clade: Monocots
- Clade: Commelinids
- Order: Poales
- Family: Cyperaceae
- Genus: Carex
- Species: C. macrocephala

Binomial name
- Carex macrocephala Willd. ex Spreng.

Synonyms
- List: Carex anthericoides J.Presl & C.Presl; Carex macrocephala subsp. anthericoides (C.Presl) Hultén; Carex macrocephala var. bracteata Holm; Carex macrocephala f. bracteata (Holm) Kük.; Carex menziesiana Sm. ex Boott; Vignea macrocephala (Willd. ex Spreng.) Soják

= Carex macrocephala =

Species of grass-like plant

Carex macrocephala, the big-head sedge or largehead sedge, is a species of flowering plant in the family Cyperaceae. It is found on the beaches and dunes of the northern Pacific; Japan, Primorsky Krai, Sakhalin, the Kurils and Kamchatka in the Russian Far East, and Alaska, British Columbia, Washington state and Oregon in North America.
