= Wilhelm Ludwig Petermann =

German botanist (1806–1855)

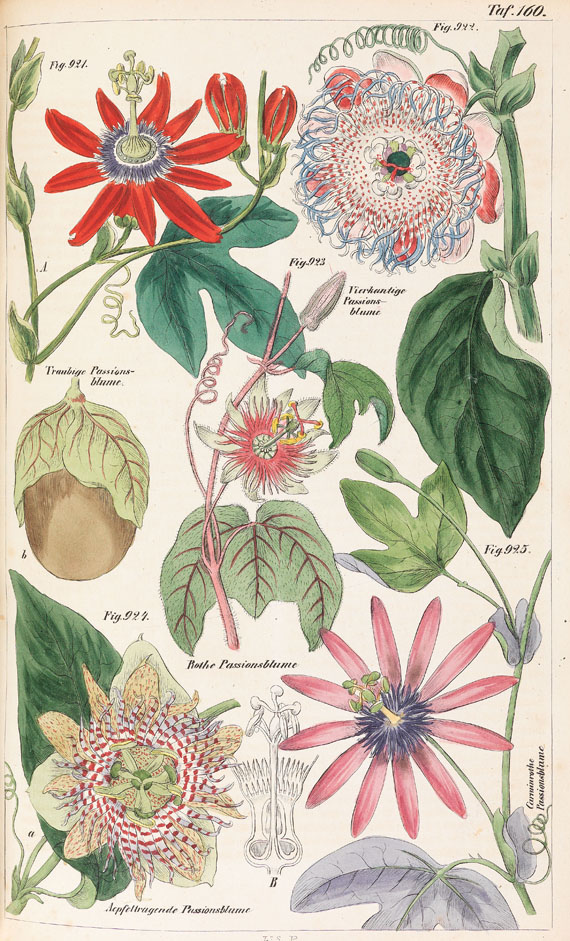
Plate from Das Pflanzenreich in vollständigen Beschreibungen

Wilhelm Ludwig Petermann (3 November 1806 Leipzig – 27 January 1855 Hanover), was a German botanist and agrostologist, professor of philosophy and botany, and curator of the Herbarium at the University of Leipzig. The standard author abbreviation Peterm. is used to indicate this person as the author when citing a botanical name. He is commemorated in the botanical genus Petermannia F.Muell.

== Selected publications ==
- 1849. Deutschlands Flora mit Abbildungen sämmtlicher Gattungen auf 100 Tafeln
- 1846. Analytischer Pflanzenschlssel für botanische Excursionen in der Umgegend von Leipzig (Excursiones botánicas con taxonomías analíticas en la vecindad de Leipzig)
- 1845. Das Pflanzenreich in vollständigen Beschreibungen aller wichtigen Gewächse dargestellt ... durch naturgetreue Abbildungen erläutert. 282 pp.
- 1841. Flora des Bienitz und seiner Umgebungen ... Mit einer Karte
- 1840. Caroli Linnaei Opera. Editio prima critica, plena, ad editiones veras exacta, textum nullo rei detrimento contractum locosque editionum discrepantes exhibens. Vol. 1., Systema vegetabilium. Ed. Lipsiae, Sumptum fecit O. Wigand
- 1838. Flora Lipsiensis excursoria, exhibens plantas phanerogamas circa Lipsiam tam sponte nascentes quam in agris cultas, simul cum arboribus et fruticibus pomerii Lipsiensis
- 1835. Caroli Linnaei Opera. Editio prima critica, plena, ad editiones veras exacta, textum nullo rei detrimento contractum locosque editionum discrepantes exhibens. Vol. 2. Systema vegetabilium. Ed. Lipsiae, Sumptum fecit O. Wigand
- 1835. De flore gramineo, adjectis graminum circa Lipsiam tam sponte nascentium quam in agris cultorum descriptionibus genericis. Dissertatio botanica
- De flore gramineo, adjectis graminum circa Lipsiam tam sponte nascentium quam in agris cultorum descriptionibus genericis. Dissertatio botanica
- Schlüssel der Gattungen nach dem künstlichen Systeme
- In Codicem Botanicum Linnaeanum Index Alphabeticus Generum Specierum Ac Synonymorum Omnium Completissimus
- Taschenbuch Der Botanik Leipzig, Volckmar. 1842
