= Isopimpinellin =

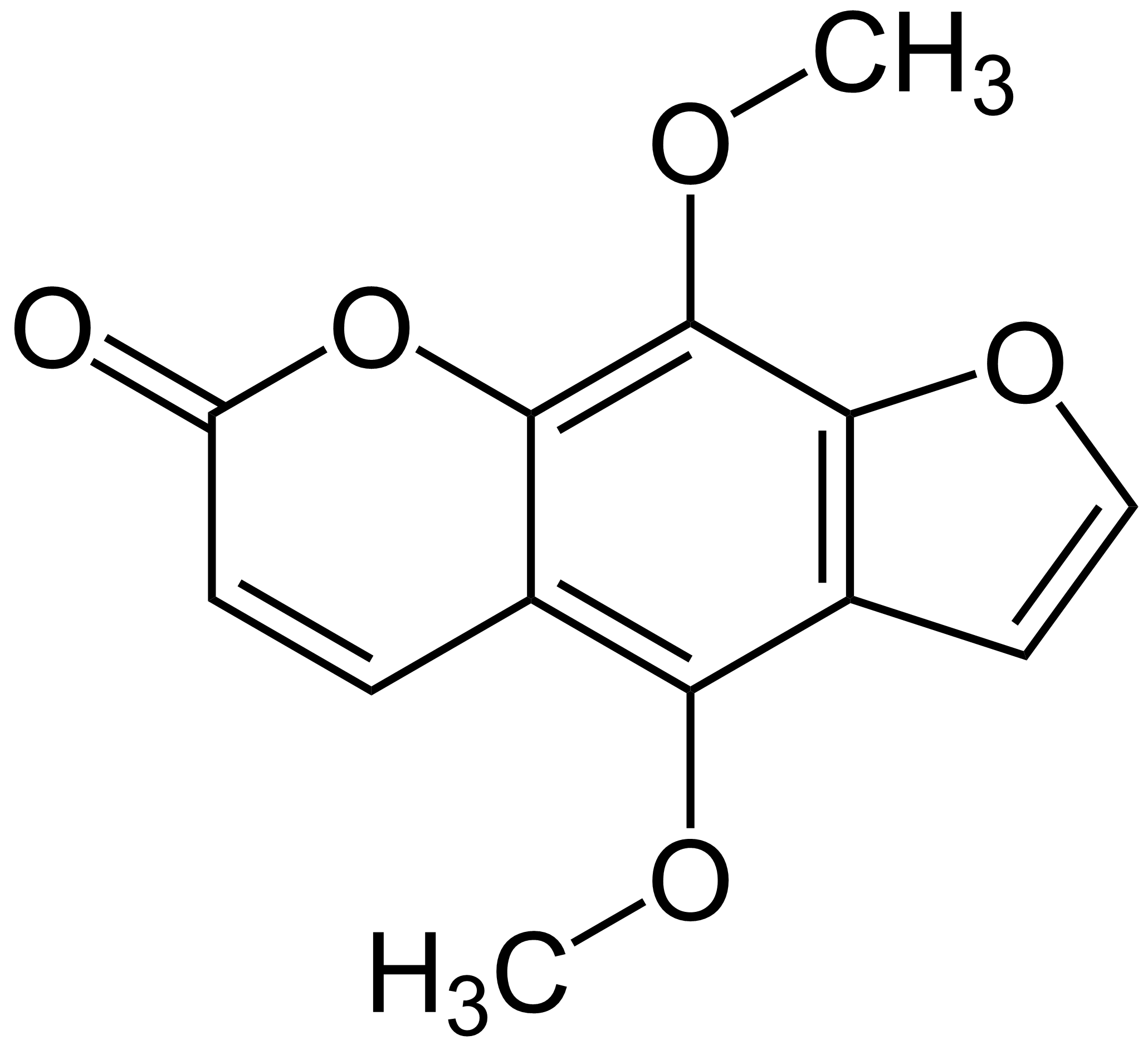

Names
- Preferred IUPAC name 4,9-Dimethoxy-7H-furo[3,2-g][1]benzopyran-7-one
- Other names 5,8-Dimethoxypsoralen; 5,8-Dimethoxypsoralene

Identifiers
CAS Number	482-27-9
3D model (JSmol)	Interactive image
ChEBI	CHEBI:28853
ChemSpider	61391
ECHA InfoCard	100.166.737
KEGG	C02162
PubChem CID	68079
UNII	20GCF755G6
CompTox Dashboard (EPA)	DTXSID30197457
- InChI: InChI=1S/C13H10O5/c1-15-10-7-3-4-9(14)18-12(7)13(16-2)11-8(10)5-6-17-11/h3-6H,1-2H3 Key: DFMAXQKDIGCMTL-UHFFFAOYSA-N; InChI=1/C13H10O5/c1-15-10-7-3-4-9(14)18-12(7)13(16-2)11-8(10)5-6-17-11/h3-6H,1-2H3 Key: DFMAXQKDIGCMTL-UHFFFAOYAB
- SMILES: COC1=C2C=COC2=C(C3=C1C=CC(=O)O3)OC

Properties
Chemical formula	C_{13}H_{10}O_{5}
Molar mass	246.21 g/mol
- Except where otherwise noted, data are given for materials in their standard state (at 25 °C [77 °F], 100 kPa). Infobox references

Isopimpinellin is a natural product synthesized by numerous plant species, especially species in the carrot family Apiaceae. The compound can be found in celery, garden angelica, parsnip, fruits and in the rind and pulp of limes. Several studies have looked into the effects of isopimpinellin and other furanocoumarins (such as bergamottin and imperatorin) as anticarcinogens. These studies have shown possible inhibition of 7,12-Dimethylbenz(a)anthracene, which are initiators of skin tumors. Evidence has also been reported that links these compounds to the inhibition of breast cancers.

== Biosynthesis ==
Isopimpinellin is a furanocoumarin thought to be synthesized through the mevalonate pathway via addition of dimethylallyl pyrophosphate (DMAPP) to a modified coumarate known as umbelliferone. The biosynthesis is shown below:

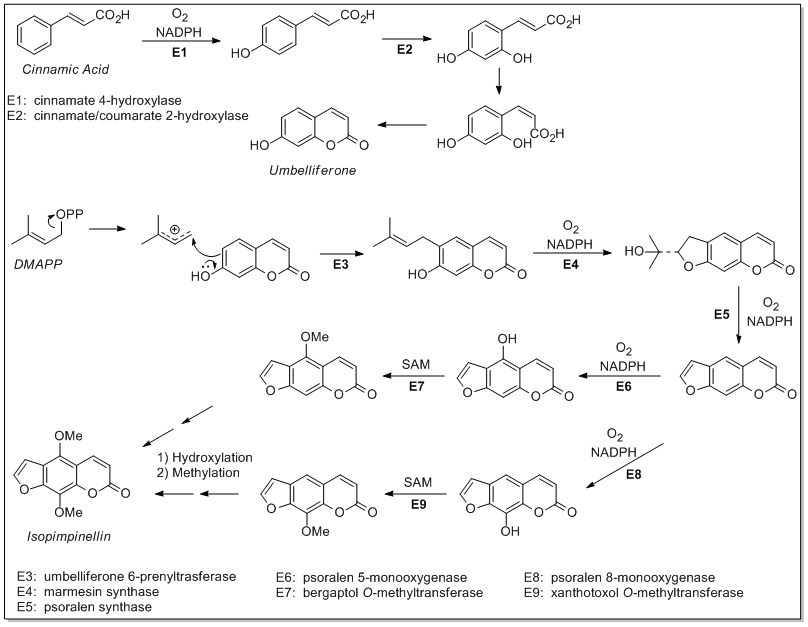
