= Angelicin =

Names
Pronunciation	ˈeɪn.dʒəlaɪ.sɪn
- Preferred IUPAC name 2H-Furo[2,3-h][1]benzopyran-2-one
- Other names Isopsoralen, 2H-furo[2,3-h]chromen-2-one, furo[2,3-h]chromen-2-one

Identifiers
CAS Number	523-50-2
3D model (JSmol)	Interactive image
ChEBI	CHEBI:28928
ChEMBL	ChEMBL53569
ChemSpider	10208
ECHA InfoCard	100.164.795
KEGG	C09060
PubChem CID	10658
UNII	CZZ080D7BD
CompTox Dashboard (EPA)	DTXSID00200321
- InChI: InChI=1S/C11H6O3/c12-10-4-2-7-1-3-9-8(5-6-13-9)11(7)14-10/h1-6H Key: XDROKJSWHURZGO-UHFFFAOYSA-N; InChI=1S/C11H6O3/c12-10-4-2-7-1-3-9-8(5-6-13-9)11(7)14-10/h1-6H
- SMILES: O=C\2Oc3c1ccoc1ccc3/C=C/2

Properties
Chemical formula	C_{11}H_{6}O_{3}
Molar mass	186.166 g·mol^{−1}
Appearance	pale yellow crystals
Melting point	134°C
Boiling point	362.6°C
Solubility in water	10 mM in DMSO
log P	1.97

Hazards
- Occupational safety and health (OHS/OSH)
Main hazards	photosensitizer, vesicant, carcinogen
Flash point	173.1°C
- Except where otherwise noted, data are given for materials in their standard state (at 25 °C [77 °F], 100 kPa). verify (what is ?) Infobox references

Angelicin is the parent compound in a family of naturally occurring organic compounds known as the angular furanocoumarins. Structurally, it can be considered as benzapyra-2-one fused with a furan moiety in the 7,8-position. Angelicin is commonly found in certain Apiaceae and Fabaceae plant species such as Bituminaria bituminosa. It has a skin permeability coefficient (LogK_{p}) of -2.46. The maximum absorption is observed at 300 nm. The ^{1}HNMR spectrum is available; the infrared and mass spectra of angelicin can be found in this database. The sublimation of angelicin occurs at 120 °C and the pressure of 0.13 Pa. Angelicin is a coumarin.

== History and etymology ==
Humans have used plants rich in angelicin for centuries. The earliest known record dates back to 3000 BC when ancient Egyptians applied the oil and sap of local Apiaceae species exposing their skin to sunlight to cure vitiligo. In meantime, tribes in India used Psoralea corylifolia which contained psoralen, the isomer of angelicin. Humans also attempted to harvest the plants as an alternative food source. However, most of them turned out to be unpalatable and toxic such as Angelica archangelica due to the ability to irritate skin and damage internal organs.

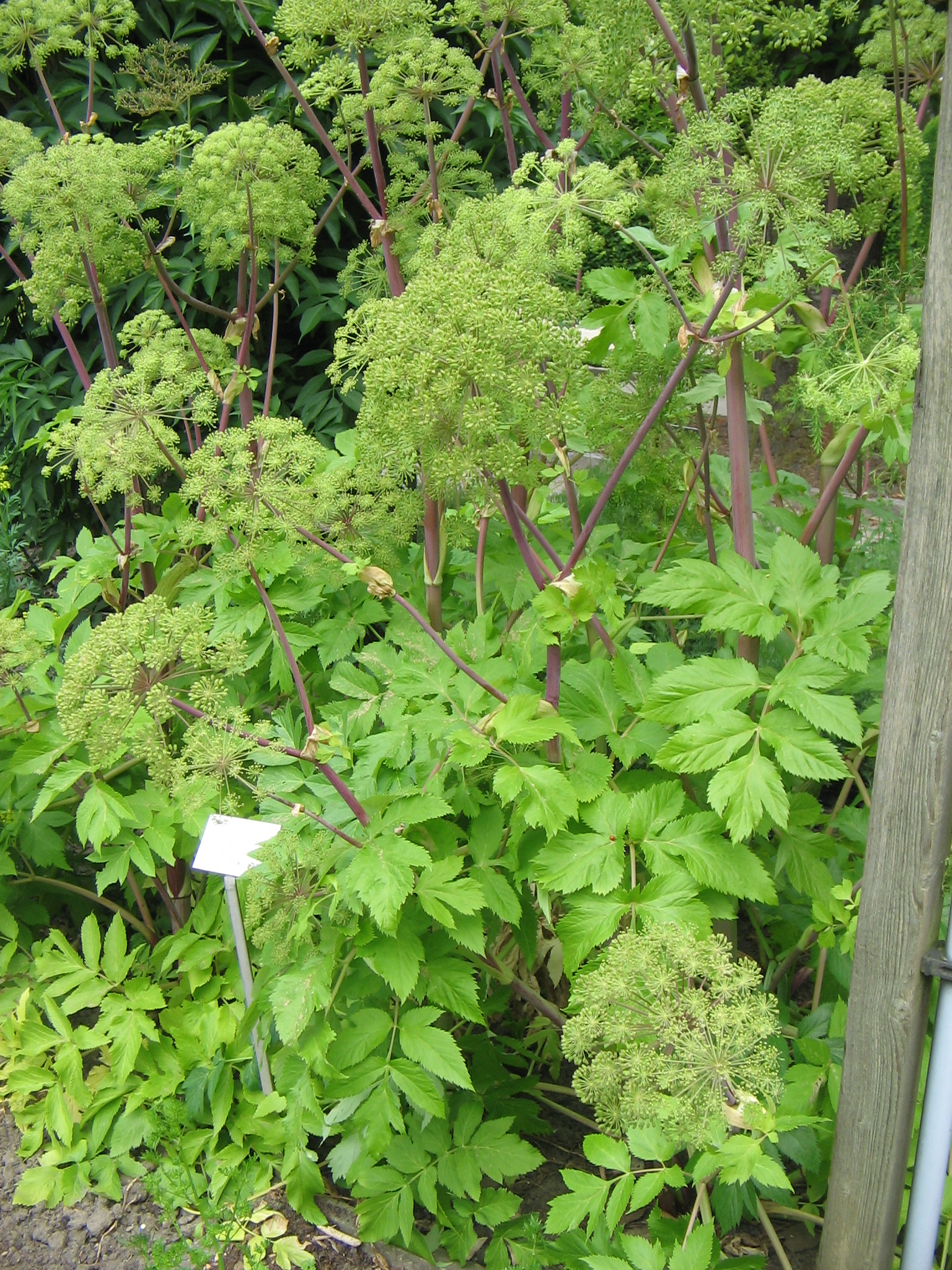
Angelica archangelica

The name "angelicin" stems from the aforementioned plant, Angelica. This Latin name originated in medieval Europe where this plant was also used as a universal treatment to many types of disease not mentioning the bubonic plague. At this time, people believed that the plant could prevent the soul from being taken over by sorcery, curse and evil spirit (add reference). Angelica would have appeared in a dream with an angel explaining its applications, hence the name. Ironically, it was later discovered that the plant's oil is toxic when utilized in large quantities particularly when the plant was fresh.

The species of plants where angelicin is found was introduced in Britain in the 19th century. Currently, it can be found in Canada and some parts of the United States and Europe. Because of the toxicity of certain plant parts and the ability of plant to proliferate, it is included in the list of invasive species.

The leaves of Angelica archangelica, which are rich in angelicin, are used to extract the compound. There were multiple studies on the toxicity of angelicin one of which showed that the compound elicits chromosomal damage in hamster cells exposed to 320-380 nm UV light. The chromosomal aberrations were shown to be also induced in humans.

Nowadays, it is debated whether Angelica should be considered toxic. However, it is certain that the toxicity is dependent on the dose of angelicin administered and is solely the matter of experts when it comes to its application.

== Biological synthesis ==
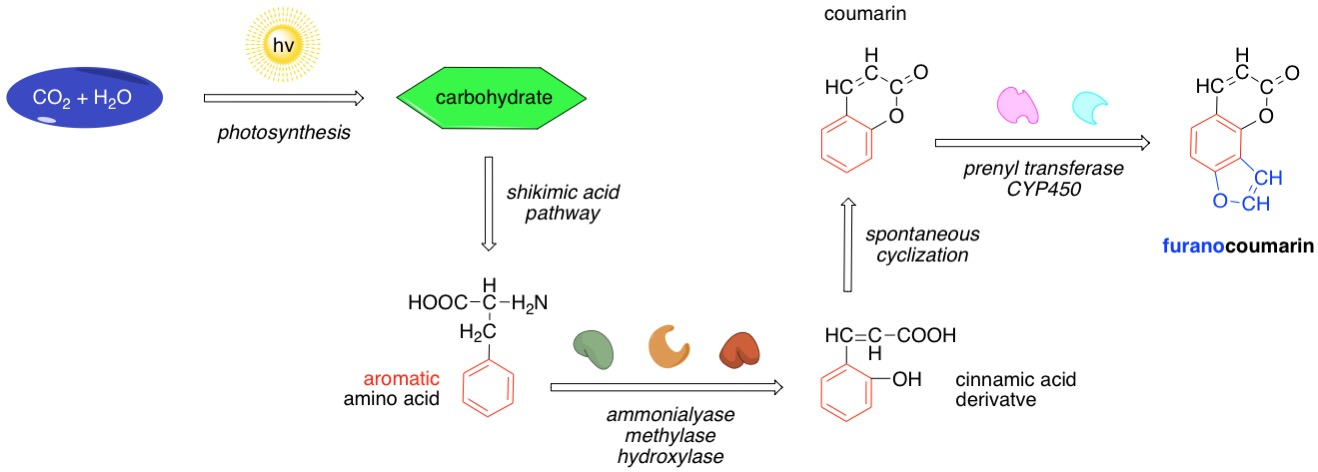
The general biosynthesis of angular furanocoumarins. Angelicin is illustrated as a final product.

The biosynthesis of angelicin can be described as a variation in the biological synthesis of furanocoumarins. It begins from the capture of organic carbon by photosynthesis and the formation of carbohydrates. Subsequently, the carbohydrates become the substrates of the shikimic acid pathway where they are converted to phenylalanine and tyrosine. Enzymes such as ammonialyases, methylases and hydroxylases then transform these amino acids to cinnamic acid derivatives which undergo o-hydroxylation yielding coumarins. The coumarins can undergo further reactions such as prenylation and oxidation to give multiple furanocoumarins one of which is angelicin.

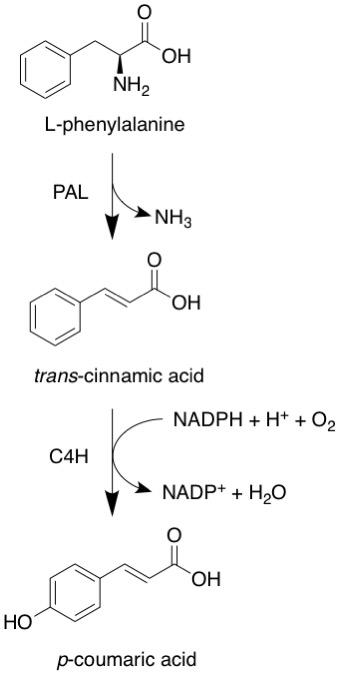
The synthesis of p-coumaric acid from phenylalanine.

Here, the biosynthesis of angelicin is described in more detail starting at L-phenylalanine as a precursor. The phenylalanine undergoes a non-oxidative deamination by phenylalanine ammonia-lyase (PAL) to trans-cinnamic acid. Afterwards, the trans-cinnamic acid is hydroxylated at the para position by trans-cinnamate 4-monooxygenase (C4H) which utilizes NADPH, H^{+} and O_{2}. The product, p-coumaric acid, is then converted to umbelliferone, the important intermediate of biosynthesis pathway.

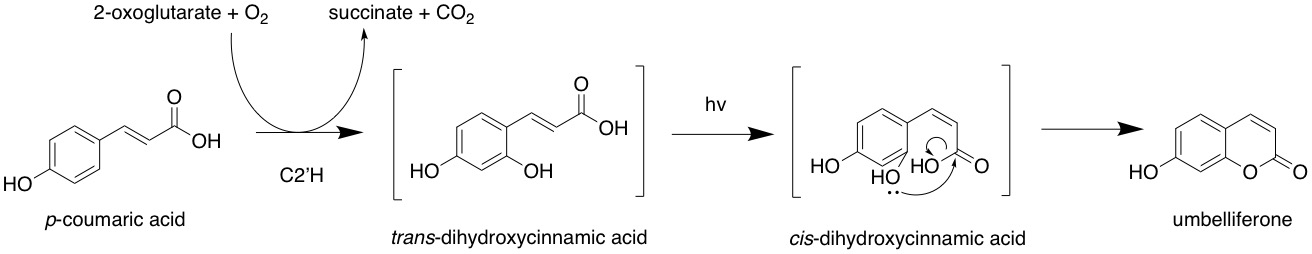
O-hydroxylation and photoisomerization of p-coumaric acid to umbelliferone.

4-Coumaric acid 2-hydroxylase (C2’H) hydroxylates the p-coumaric acid at the ortho position. Notably, this reaction uses alpha-ketoglutarate which is reduced to succinate both of which are involved in the Krebs cycle. The newly formed trans-dihydrocinnamic acid undergoes a photochemical isomerization to a cis isomer which spontaneously lactonizes to yield umbeliferone.

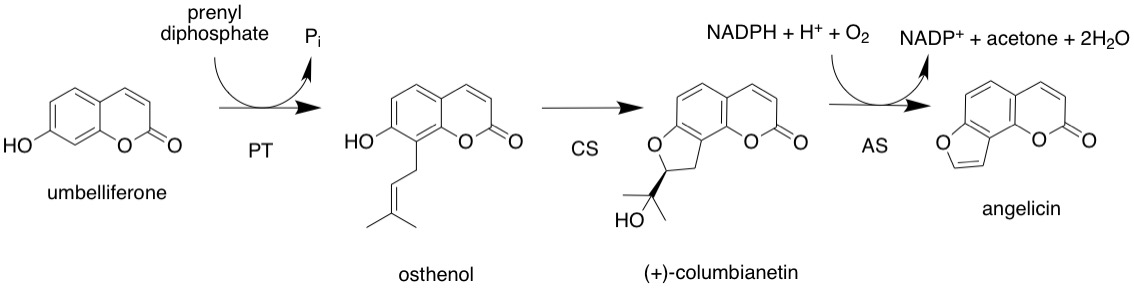
Formation of angelicin from umbelliferone.

Subsequently, umbelliferone 6-prenyltransferase (PT) couples umbelliferone with prenyl diphosphate to give osthenol and pyrophosphate. Osthenol is oxidized to (+)-columbianetin by (+)-columbianetin synthase (CS), a putative plant cytochrome P450, although the details of this reaction are not clear. The biosynthesis is terminated with the oxidation of (+)-columbianetin yielding angelicin by angelicin synthase (AS) which is also considered as the enzyme of cytochrome P450 family.

It is noteworthy that the biosynthesis of angelicin diverges at the umbelliferone as it is also converted to psoralen, the isomer of angelicin. In fact, psoralen, from which the family of linear furanocoumarins descends, is by far much more abundant in plants than angelicin. As a result, most herbivorous insects are resistant to psoralen. Now, it is increasingly recognized that plants devised the pathway leading to angelicin as an alternative defense mechanism. For example, angelicin enhances the toxicity of psoralen by acting as an inhibitor of the detoxifying cytochrome P450 in insects. Moreover, the comparison of the protein sequences of psoralen synthase and angelicin synthase shows a 70% identity overall and 40% identity in the substrate recognition sites. This implies that the biosynthesis of angelicin is a relatively recently evolved trait.

== Chemical synthesis ==
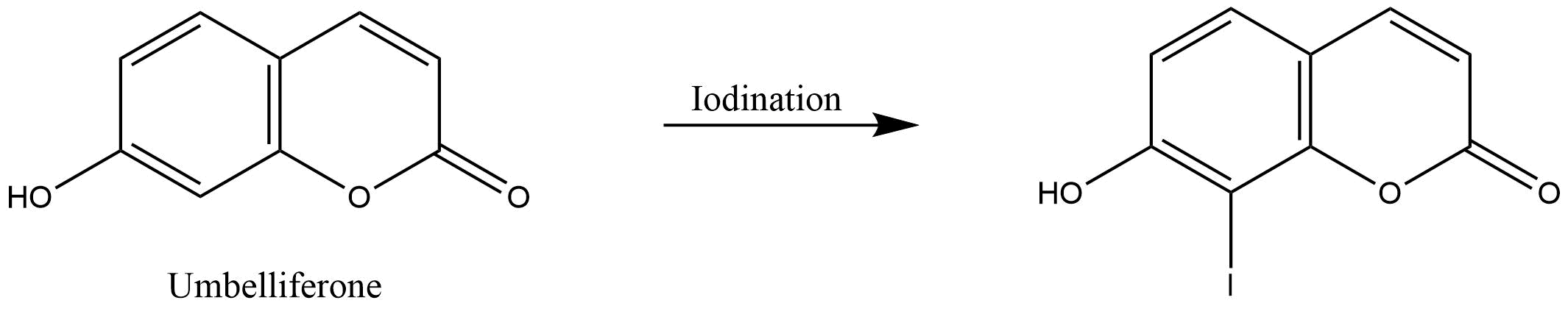
Iodination of umbelliferone.

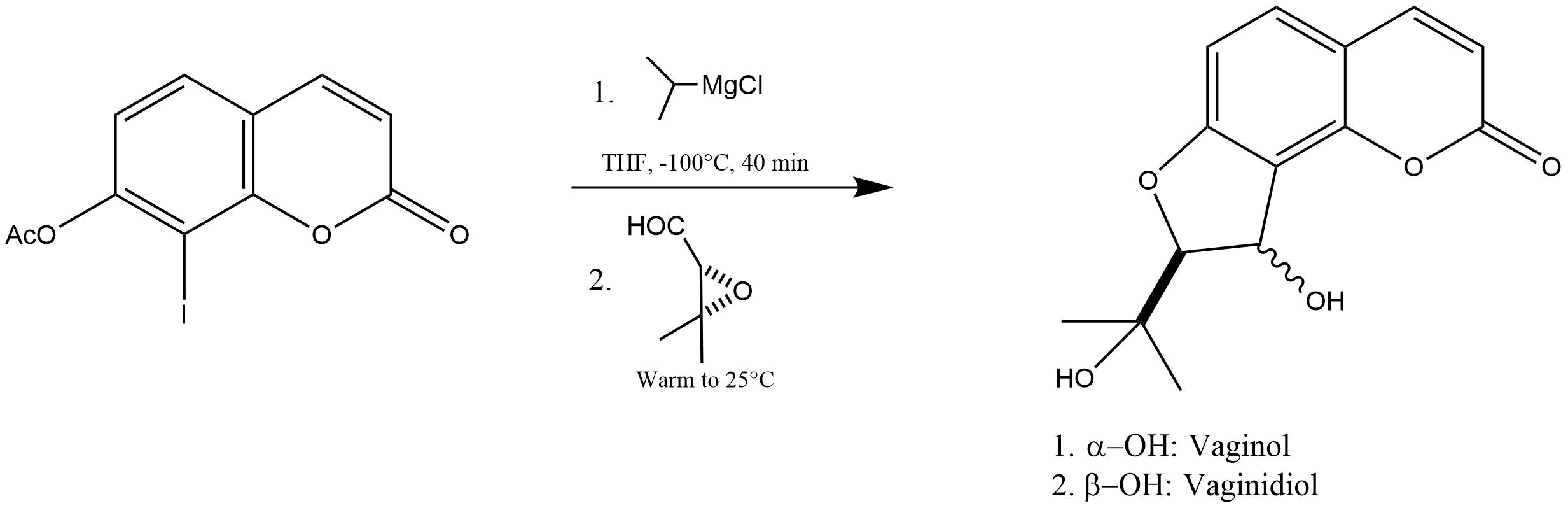
Vaginol synthesis from umbelliferone derivative.

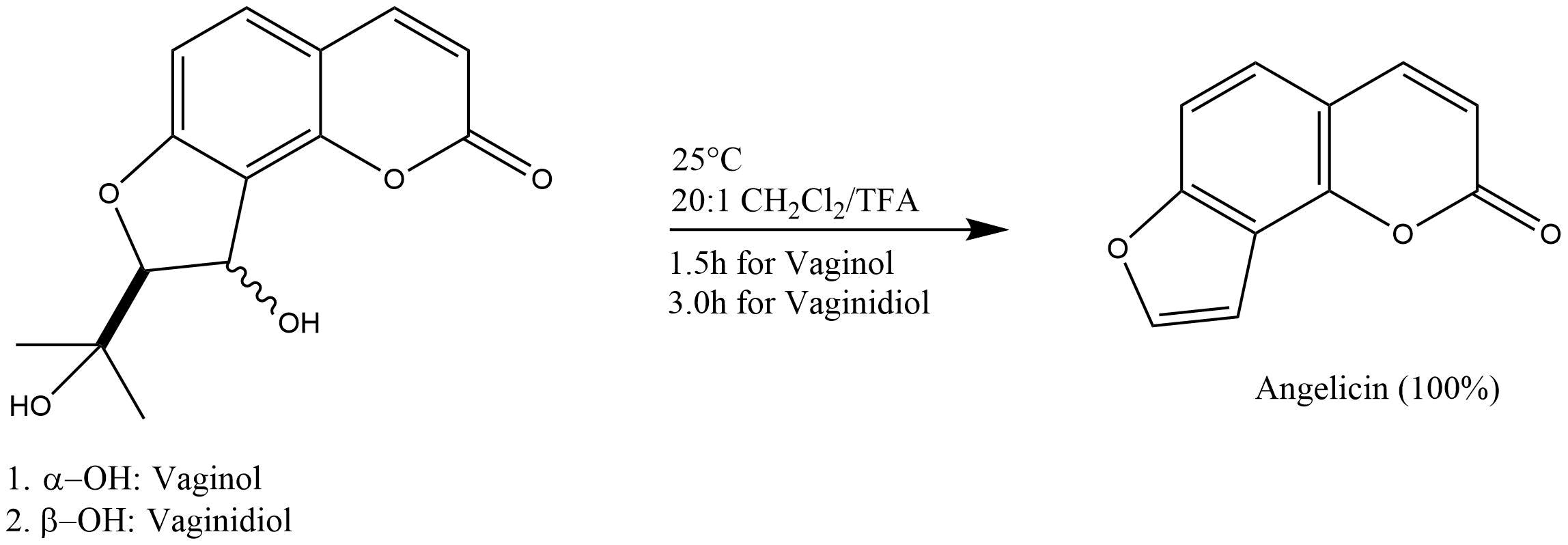
Formation of angelicin from vaginol.

Iodination of commercially available umbelliferone (7-hydroxycoumarin) yields 7-hydroxy-8-iodocoumarin. Acetoxy group can be introduced into hydroxyl of 7-hydroxy-8-iodocoumarin, which is used to create vaginol or vaginidiol with an isopropyl Grignard reagent and commercially available epoxy aldehydes. Subsequent acid-catalysed fragmentation of vaginol with dichloromethane in trifluoroacetic acid yields angelicin.

The compound can be isolated from natural sources, albeit this affords a low yield due to the prevalence of other furanocoumarins. The popular technique is air drying the aerial parts and ground roots of plant followed by n-hexane extraction and column chromatography over silica gel.

== Medical use ==
Angelicin derivatives are used to treat psoriasis and cancer. One way of treating these diseases is by photochemotherapy (PUVA) which combines UV irradiation with photosensitizing chemical. In most cases the 4,5’-dimethylangelicin is applied owing to its firm binding and specificity to DNA. Also, it was shown that it is actively inhibits the synthesis of nucleic acids in tumor cells thereby decreasing their growth.

In PUVA, angelicin is less popular than psoralen, although both furanocoumarins are photosensitizing and used in couple with long-wave UV irradiation. Angelicin and psoralen are used in other skin disorders such as vitiligo and mycosis. DNA photobinding is the most studied aspect of the photobiology and photochemistry of angelicin. According to the mechanism, long-range UV light triggers angelicin to bind to the pyrimidine bases of DNA in the same manner as psoralen. In this way, the inhibition of DNA replication via the formation of photoadducts can occur. This might be the basis for the desired therapeutic effect as in the case of psoralen derivatives.

However, extreme care should be taken while using PUVA due to the side effects it may bring. Therefore, this type of treatment is sometimes used as a last resort and often corticosteroids are used instead. One of the main adverse effects of PUVA is phototoxicity which can be tackled by heteroanalogues of angelicin. For example, recently researchers have shown that if furan ring is replaced by 1-substituted pyrazole or thiophene ring, the new angelicin heteroanalogues show virtually no phototoxicity.

== Interaction with biomolecules ==
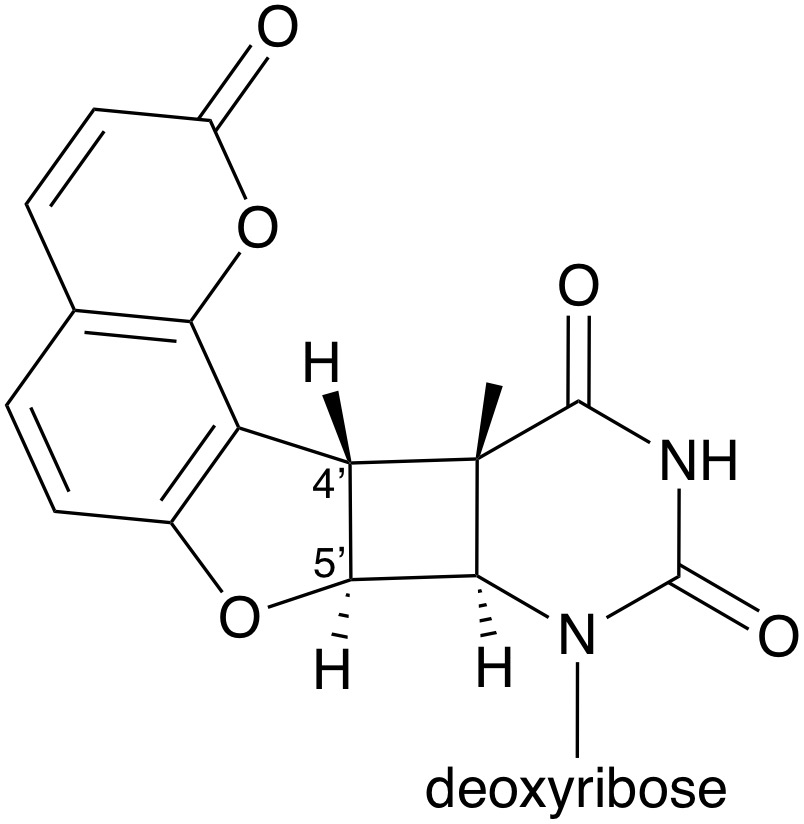
Thymidine adduct of angelicin.

It was shown that angelicin exhibits a multifaceted effect on various biomolecules which stem from the compound's structure and photoreactivity. For example, the planar structure allows angelicin to intercalate between the DNA bases. When exposed to ultraviolet light, it undergoes a C_{4}-photocycloaddition reaction with thymine and cytosine forming a monoadduct. The double bonds of angelicin involved in this reaction are the 3,4 and 4’,5’. However, the rest of the angelicin's aromatic system cannot react with the pyrimidine of complementary strand owing to the unfavorable alignment of reactive double bonds. Lipids are also susceptible to the photoinduced reactions with angelicin which can be either aerobic or anaerobic. The aerobic reactions cause lipid peroxidation whereas the anaerobic pathway leads to the conjugation of angelicin with unsaturated fatty acid chains such as linolenic acid in a manner similar to the formation of pyrimidine adducts.

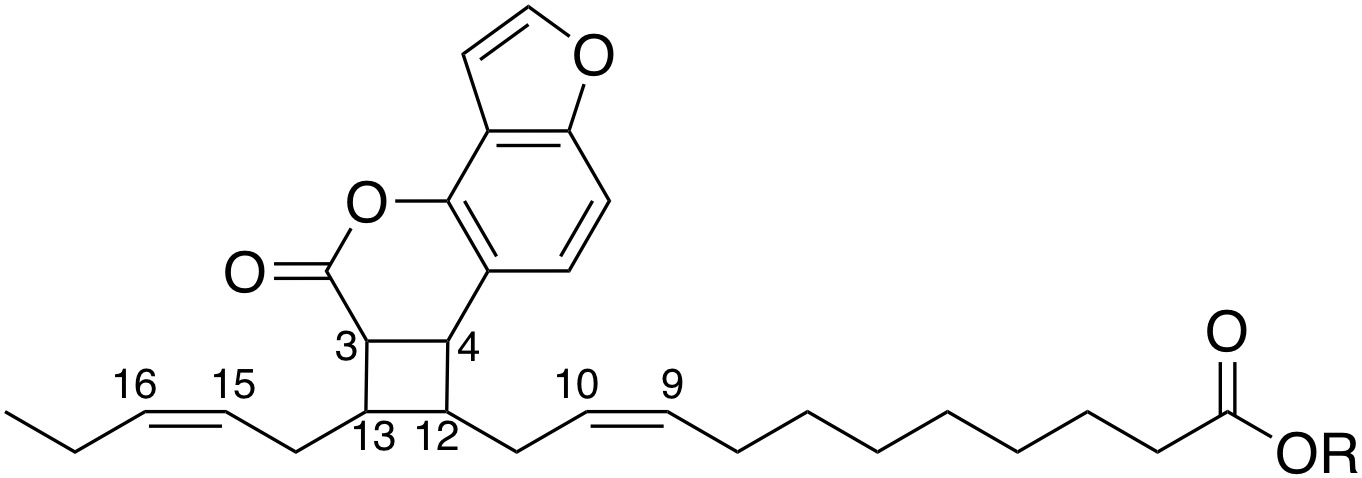
The product of angelicin cycloaddition with the ester of linoleic acid.

Proteins were demonstrated to interact with angelicin in a non-covalent fashion. For instance, there is a measurable affinity of angelicin towards human serum albumin (19.10 × 10^{4} mol^{−1}L^{−1}) which has one non-covalent binding site per angelicin molecule. The ultraviolet light (365 nm) facilitates its covalent binding to proteins which is enhanced in the presence of oxygen. At this wavelength, angelicin can also modify certain amino acids.

== Toxicity ==
According to the MSDS of Sigma-Aldrich, the LD_{50} of angelicin is 322 mg/kg which shows acute toxicity if orally administered to rats. The possible consequences are alteration in circadian rhythm and righting reflex, ataxia and analgesia.

Through its presence in plants such as Angelica archangelica, angelicin was shown to have toxic effects on humans, notably by causing skin irritability and organ damage. More specifically, it causes phototoxic and photomutagenic effects when in contact with skin, as it enhances the sensitivity of skin to UV light, leading to severe skin damage such as erythema and blisters. Upon irradiation with UV light of longer wavelength, angelicin forms DNA monoadducts which can cause skin cancer. In contrast, the isomer of angelicin, psoralen, was reported to be five to ten times more active than angelicin and cross-link DNA . This impedes DNA replication more prominently due to the inability for the two strands of DNA helix to separate. Both psoralen and angelicin can be used in cancer therapeutics to suppress DNA replication in tumor cells and induce apoptosis – as mentioned in medical use – but they should be handled with care as they can cause photodermatitis in healthy cells as a side effect.

In mammalian cell cultures, angelicin showed mutagenic and cytotoxic effects while playing a role of strong inhibitor of drug metabolism. The inhibition is due to the fact that angelicin decreases the activity and expression of CYP1A1 which is regulated by aryl hydrocarbon receptors (AhR). There are three hypotheses proposed to explain the phenomenon:

1. Angelicin attenuates the catalytic activity performed by CYP1A1 regardless the presence of UV light.
2. Angelicin triggers the gene expression of CYP1A1 by activation of AhR when no UV light is available.
3. Angelicin leads to CYP1A1 gene expression without the involvement of AhR.

The phototoxic properties of angelicin were deployed by its use as a natural pesticide and disinfectant. Note that it is difficult to readily determine whether only angelicin poses the highest risk of phototoxicity and photomutagenicity as in plants angelicin always occurs in a mixture with angelicin derivatives, psoralen and other furanocoumarins. Moreover, the furanocoumarin composition of most plant species is not definitely known as well as the toxic properties of some furanocoumarins.
