= Osthol =

Names
- Preferred IUPAC name 7-Methoxy-8-(3-methylbut-2-en-1-yl)-2H-1-benzopyran-2-one
- Other names Osthole

Identifiers
CAS Number	484-12-8
3D model (JSmol)	Interactive image
ChEMBL	ChEMBL52229
ChemSpider	9811
ECHA InfoCard	100.125.338
KEGG	C09280
PubChem CID	10228
UNII	XH1TI1759C
CompTox Dashboard (EPA)	DTXSID20197507
- InChI: InChI=1S/C15H16O3/c1-10(2)4-7-12-13(17-3)8-5-11-6-9-14(16)18-15(11)12/h4-6,8-9H,7H2,1-3H3 Key: MBRLOUHOWLUMFF-UHFFFAOYSA-N; InChI=1/C15H16O3/c1-10(2)4-7-12-13(17-3)8-5-11-6-9-14(16)18-15(11)12/h4-6,8-9H,7H2,1-3H3 Key: MBRLOUHOWLUMFF-UHFFFAOYAW
- SMILES: O=C/2Oc1c(c(OC)ccc1\C=C\2)C\C=C(/C)C

Properties
Chemical formula	C_{15}H_{16}O_{3}
Molar mass	244.290 g·mol^{−1}
- Except where otherwise noted, data are given for materials in their standard state (at 25 °C [77 °F], 100 kPa). verify (what is ?) Infobox references

Osthol, or osthole, is a chemical compound which is a derivative of coumarin. It is found in a variety of plants including Cnidium monnieri, Angelica archangelica and Angelica pubescens.
