= S-adenosyl-L-methionine:xanthotoxol O-methyltransferase =

S-adenosyl-L-methionine:xanthotoxol O-methyltransferase may refer to:

- 8-hydroxyfuranocoumarin 8-O-methyltransferase
- Xanthotoxol O-methyltransferase
