= Cnidium monnieri =

Scientific classification
- Kingdom: Plantae
- Clade: Tracheophytes
- Clade: Angiosperms
- Clade: Eudicots
- Clade: Asterids
- Order: Apiales
- Family: Apiaceae
- Genus: Cnidium
- Species: C. monnieri

Binomial name
- Cnidium monnieri (L.) Cusson

Species of flowering plant

Cnidium monnieri (L.) Cusson ex Juss., Monnier's snowparsley, is a flowering plant species in the genus Cnidium. Also known as Shechuangzi, Osthole, Jashoshi, Cnidii Fructus (Fruits of Cnidium). It may be confused with Bacopa monnieri, Ligusticum officinale (syn. Cnidium officinale), both similar but different plants. The coumarins osthol, imperatorin and xanthotoxol can be found in C. monnieri.

== Naming ==
Cnidium monnieri was already described and the name validly published by Carl Linnaeus. It was Pierre Cusson, however, who reclassified it into today's valid botanical systematics in 1787.

== Taxonomy ==
Cnidium monnieri is a species in the genus Cnidium which contains approximately 11 to 35 species and belongs to the family of the Apiaceae (carrot family).

== Characteristics ==
Plants annual, 10–60(–80) cm. Taproot 2–3 mm thick. Stem solitary, striate, scabrous. Lower petioles 3–8 cm; blade ovate-lanceolate, 3–8 × 2–5 cm, 2–3-pinnate; ultimate segments linear to linear-lanceolate, 3–10 × 1–1.5 mm, veins and margins scabrous. Umbels 2–3(–5) cm across; bracts 6–10, linear to linear-lanceolate, 2–3 mm, persistent, margins narrowly white membranous, very finely ciliate; rays 8–20(–30), 5–20 mm, unequal; bracteoles 5–9, linear, nearly equal pedicels, margins ciliate; umbellules 15–20-flowered; pedicels 3–5 mm. Calyx teeth obsolete or minute. Stylopodium conic; styles 3–4 times longer than stylopodium. Fruit ovoid, 1.5–3 × 1–2 mm; lateral ribs slightly broader than the dorsal. Seed face plane. Fl. Apr–Jul, fr. Jul–Oct.

=== Growth ===
The plants reach heights of 10 to 80 centimetres.

=== Leaves ===
Cnidium monnieri has bipinnate leaves that are alternate. The linear leaflets are ciliate and petiolate.

=== Flowers and fruits ===
Cnidium monnieri produces compound umbels of white five-stellate flowers from April to July.

The plants produce achenes.

=== Distribution ===
Cnidium monnieri is native to India, China, Korea, Laos, Mongolia, Vietnam, the European Russia (Belarus, Ukraine, Moldova, Crimea) and Europe. Grows in riparian grasslands and is adventive in North America (Oregon).

== Cultivation ==
Pests and Diseases Literature:

- Walter Erhardt, Erich Götz, Nils Bödeker, Siegmund Seybold: Der große Zander. Eugen Ulmer KG, Stuttgart 2008, ISBN 978-3-8001-5406-7. (Ger.)
- Christopher Brickell (Editor-in-chief): RHS A-Z Encyclopedia of Garden Plants. Third edition. Dorling Kindersley, London 2003, ISBN 0-7513-3738-2.

== Medicinal use ==
Cnidium monnieri (L.) Cuss. is one of the most widely used traditional herbal medicines and its fruits have been used to treat a variety of diseases in China, Vietnam, and Japan. As of this writing, 350 compounds have been isolated and identified from C. monnieri, including the main active constituent, coumarins. In vitro and in vivo studies suggest that osthole and other coumarin compounds possess wide range of pharmacological properties effective in the treatment of disorders of the female genitalia, male impotence, frigidity, skin-related diseases, and that, in this context, they exhibit strong antipruritic, anti-allergic, antidermatophytic, antibacterial, antifungal, anti-osteoporotic effects. Although coumarins have been identified as the main active constituents responsible for the observed pharmacological effects, the molecular mechanisms of their actions are still unknown. A pro-erectile herb from traditional Chinese medicine, Cnidium monnieri and its main bioactive known as osthole appear to have mechanisms similar to Viagra in penile tissue and the hippocampus; the influence of Cnidium monnieri on testosterone and cognition remains unexplored.

Cnidii Fructus has also been used in the treatment of lumbar pain. The fruit is known for its anti-inflammatory and analgesic properties, which can help alleviate discomfort in the lower back. Traditional preparations often involve combining Cnidii Fructus with other herbs to enhance its therapeutic effects. Bioactive compounds in Cnidii Fructus, such as osthol, contribute to its pain-relieving capabilities.
