= Angelicin synthase =

Class of enzymes

Identifiers
- EC no.: 1.14.14.148

Databases
- IntEnz: IntEnz view
- BRENDA: BRENDA entry
- ExPASy: NiceZyme view
- KEGG: KEGG entry
- MetaCyc: metabolic pathway
- PRIAM: profile
- PDB structures: RCSB PDB PDBe PDBsum
Search
- PMC: articles
- PubMed: articles
- NCBI: proteins

Angelicin synthase (EC 1.14.14.148, CYP71AJ4 (gene)) is an enzyme with systematic name (+)-columbianetin,NADPH:oxygen oxidoreductase. It catalyses the following chemical reaction:

(S)-columbianetin
O_{2}
2 H_{2}O
angelicin
+
acetone

Angelicin synthase is a cytochrome P450 protein containing heme, isolated from parsnip. It uses molecular oxygen for the oxidation and requires a partner cytochrome P450 reductase for functional expression. This uses nicotinamide adenine dinucleotide phosphate.
