= Skimmin =

Names
- IUPAC name 7-(β-D-Glucopyranosyloxy)-2H-1-benzopyran-2-one
- Systematic IUPAC name 7-{[(2S,3R,4S,5S,6R)-3,4,5-Trihydroxy-6-(hydroxymethyl)oxan-2-yl]oxy}-2H-1-benzopyran-2-one
- Other names 7-O-β-D-glucopyranosylumbelliferone

Identifiers
CAS Number	93-39-0
3D model (JSmol)	Interactive image
ChemSpider	90069
PubChem CID	99693
UNII	H072F03PQN
CompTox Dashboard (EPA)	DTXSID201018989
- InChI: InChI=1S/C15H16O8/c16-6-10-12(18)13(19)14(20)15(23-10)21-8-3-1-7-2-4-11(17)22-9(7)5-8/h1-5,10,12-16,18-20H,6H2/t10-,12-,13+,14-,15-/m1/s1 Key: VPAOSFFTKWUGAD-TVKJYDDYSA-N; InChI=1/C15H16O8/c16-6-10-12(18)13(19)14(20)15(23-10)21-8-3-1-7-2-4-11(17)22-9(7)5-8/h1-5,10,12-16,18-20H,6H2/t10-,12-,13+,14-,15-/m1/s1 Key: VPAOSFFTKWUGAD-TVKJYDDYBF
- SMILES: c1cc(cc2c1ccc(=O)o2)O[C@H]3[C@@H]([C@H]([C@@H]([C@H](O3)CO)O)O)O

Properties
Chemical formula	C_{15}H_{16}O_{8}
Molar mass	324.285 g·mol^{−1}
- Except where otherwise noted, data are given for materials in their standard state (at 25 °C [77 °F], 100 kPa). Infobox references

Skimmin is a glucoside of umbelliferone.
