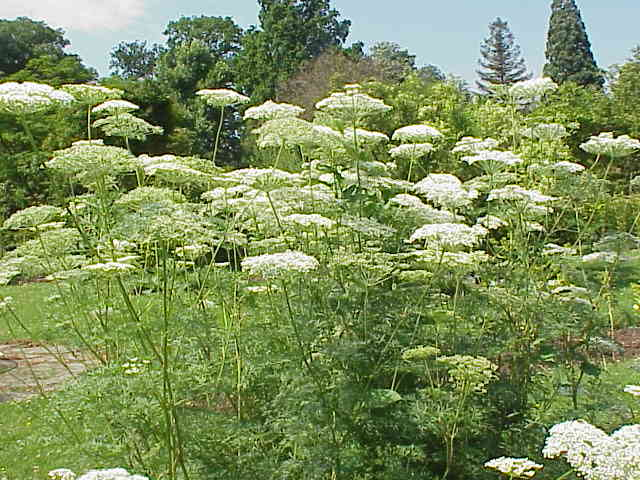
- Cnidium silaifolium

Scientific classification
- Kingdom: Plantae
- Clade: Embryophytes
- Clade: Tracheophytes
- Clade: Spermatophytes
- Clade: Angiosperms
- Clade: Eudicots
- Clade: Asterids
- Order: Apiales
- Family: Apiaceae
- Subfamily: Apioideae
- Tribe: Selineae
- Genus: Cnidium; Cusson ex Juss.

Species
- See text.

= Cnidium =

Genus of flowering plants in the celery family

Cnidium is a genus of flowering plants in the family Apiaceae, native to Eurasia and North America.

== Species ==
As of December 2022, Plants of the World Online accepted the following species:

- Cnidium bhutanicum M.F.Watson
- Cnidium cnidiifolium (Turcz.) Schischk.
- Cnidium dauricum (Jacq.) Fisch. & C.A.Mey.
- Cnidium divaricatum (Jacq.) Ledeb.
- Cnidium japonicum Miq.
- Cnidium monnieri (L.) Cusson
- Cnidium silaifolium (Jacq.) Simonk.
- Cnidium warburgii H.Wolff
