= Imperatorin =

Names
- Preferred IUPAC name 9-[(3-Methylbut-2-en-1-yl)oxy]-7H-furo[3,2-g][1]benzopyran-7-one
- Other names Ammidin; Marmelosin; Pentosalen; 8-Isoamylenoxypsoralen; 8-Isopentenyloxypsoralene

Identifiers
CAS Number	482-44-0
3D model (JSmol)	Interactive image
ChEBI	CHEBI:5885
ChEMBL	ChEMBL453805
ChemSpider	9797
ECHA InfoCard	100.006.893
KEGG	C09269
PubChem CID	10212
UNII	K713N25C78
CompTox Dashboard (EPA)	DTXSID8048737
- InChI: InChI=1S/C16H14O4/c1-10(2)5-7-19-16-14-12(6-8-18-14)9-11-3-4-13(17)20-15(11)16/h3-6,8-9H,7H2,1-2H3 Key: OLOOJGVNMBJLLR-UHFFFAOYSA-N; InChI=1/C16H14O4/c1-10(2)5-7-19-16-14-12(6-8-18-14)9-11-3-4-13(17)20-15(11)16/h3-6,8-9H,7H2,1-2H3 Key: OLOOJGVNMBJLLR-UHFFFAOYAQ
- SMILES: O=C/3Oc2c(OC\C=C(/C)C)c1occc1cc2\C=C\3

Properties
Chemical formula	C_{16}H_{14}O_{4}
Molar mass	270.28 g/mol
- Except where otherwise noted, data are given for materials in their standard state (at 25 °C [77 °F], 100 kPa). verify (what is ?) Infobox references

Imperatorin is a furocoumarin and a phytochemical that has been isolated from Urena lobata L. (Malvaceae), Angelica archangelica, Angelica dahurica, Glehnia littoralis, Saposhnikovia divaricata, Cnidium monnieri, Incarvillea younghusbandii, and Zanthoxylum americanum mill. It is biosynthesized from umbelliferone, a coumarin derivative.

== Isolation ==
The procedure for the isolation of imperatorin from Urena lobata involves exhaustively extracting under reflux with benzene the air-dried and pulverised roots followed by separation by column chromatography.

== Biochemical activity ==
Imperatorin was identified from a Bioactive Molecules library in a high throughput screening experiment for inhibitors of the phosphodiesterase PDE4. It displays a significant preference for PDE4B over PDE4A. Imperatorin has been shown to have anti-inflammatory activity in chondrocytes. Imperatorin treatment inhibits the expression of iNOS and suppresses the production of NO in osteoarthritic chondrocytes.

== See also ==
- Psoralen, the parent furocoumarin.
