= Apterin =

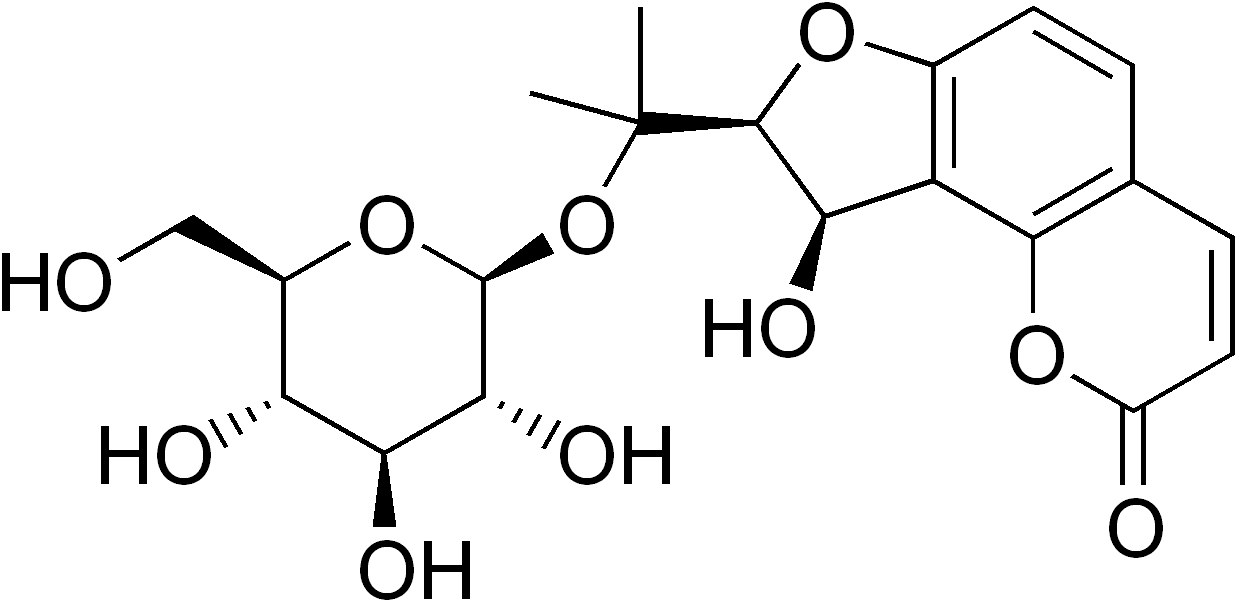

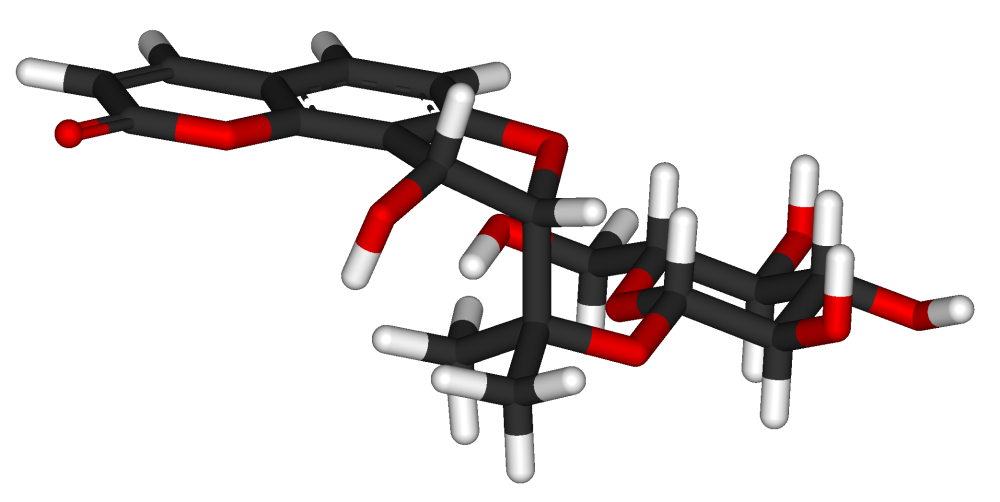

Names
- IUPAC name (8S,9R)-8-[2-(β-D-Glucopyranosyloxy)propan-2-yl]-9-hydroxy-8,9-dihydro-2H-furo[2,3-h][1]benzopyran-2-one
- Systematic IUPAC name (8S,9R)-9-Hydroxy-8-(2-{[(2S,3R,4S,5S,6R)-3,4,5-trihydroxy-6-(hydroxymethyl)oxan-2-yl]oxy}propan-2-yl)-8,9-dihydro-2H-furo[2,3-h][1]benzopyran-2-one

Identifiers
CAS Number	53947-89-0
3D model (JSmol)	Interactive image
ChemSpider	26286869
PubChem CID	15945058
CompTox Dashboard (EPA)	DTXSID10726668
- InChI: InChI=1S/C20H24O10/c1-20(2,30-19-16(26)15(25)13(23)10(7-21)28-19)18-14(24)12-9(27-18)5-3-8-4-6-11(22)29-17(8)12/h3-6,10,13-16,18-19,21,23-26H,7H2,1-2H3/t10-,13-,14-,15+,16-,18+,19+/m1/s1 Key: ALEQYOXVXJKFOM-KTZZUYPUSA-N; InChI=1/C20H24O10/c1-20(2,30-19-16(26)15(25)13(23)10(7-21)28-19)18-14(24)12-9(27-18)5-3-8-4-6-11(22)29-17(8)12/h3-6,10,13-16,18-19,21,23-26H,7H2,1-2H3/t10-,13-,14-,15+,16-,18+,19+/m1/s1 Key: ALEQYOXVXJKFOM-KTZZUYPUBG
- SMILES: CC(C)([C@@H]1[C@@H](c2c(ccc3c2oc(=O)cc3)O1)O)O[C@H]4[C@@H]([C@H]([C@@H]([C@H](O4)CO)O)O)O

Properties
Chemical formula	C_{20}H_{24}O_{10}
Molar mass	424.402 g·mol^{−1}
- Except where otherwise noted, data are given for materials in their standard state (at 25 °C [77 °F], 100 kPa). verify (what is ?) Infobox references

Apterin is a furanocoumarin and the glucoside of vaginol. It has been isolated from the root of plants in the family Apiaceae such as members of the genus Angelica, including the garden angelica and Zizia aptera.
