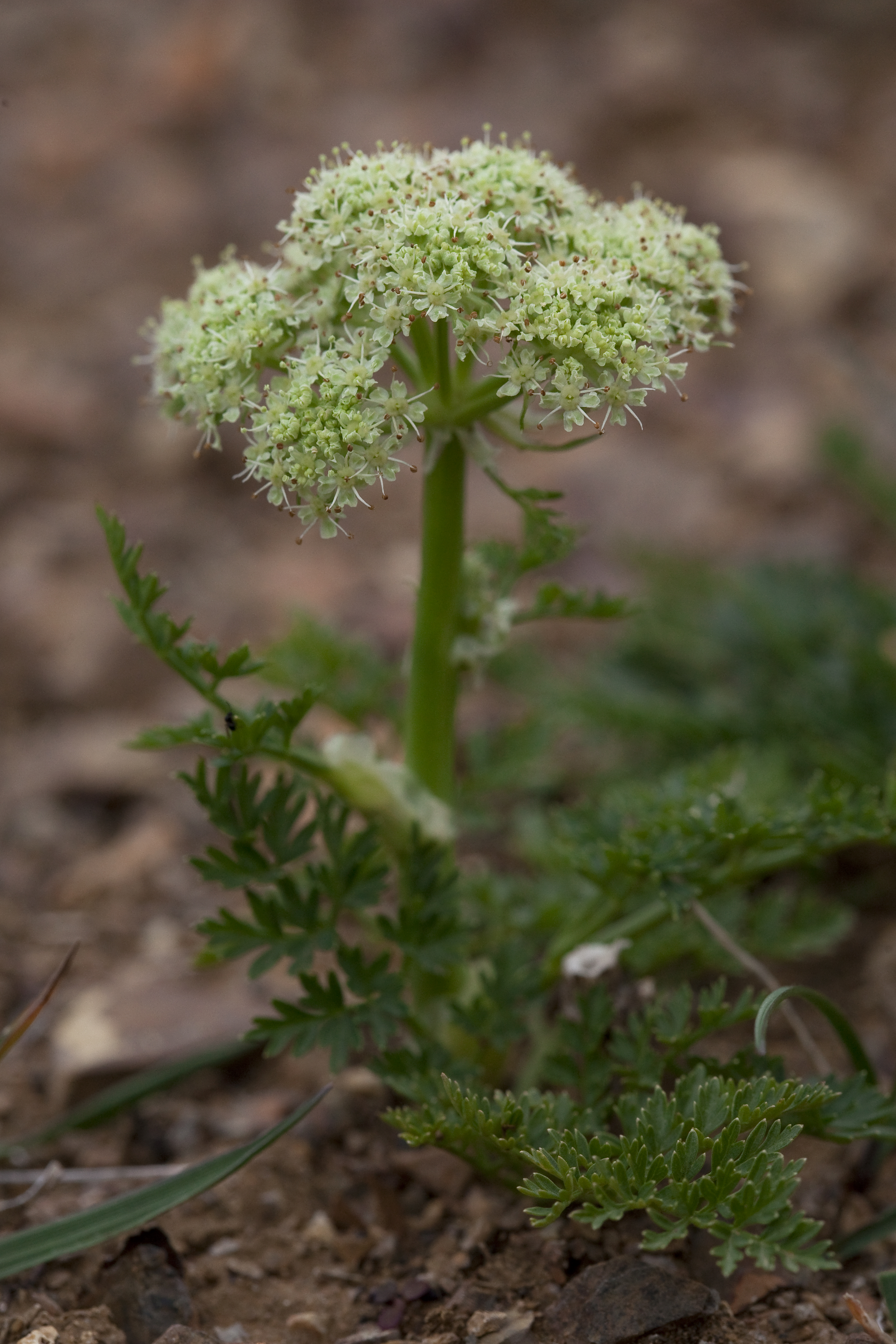

Conservation status
- Secure (NatureServe)

Scientific classification
- Kingdom: Plantae
- Clade: Tracheophytes
- Clade: Angiosperms
- Clade: Eudicots
- Clade: Asterids
- Order: Apiales
- Family: Apiaceae
- Genus: Cnidium
- Species: C. cnidiifolium

Binomial name
- Cnidium cnidiifolium (Turcz.) Schischk.

Synonyms
- Conioselinum cnidiifolium

= Cnidium cnidiifolium =

Species of flowering plant

Cnidium cnidiifolium is a species of flowering plant in the parsley family, Apiaceae. Its common names include northern hemlock-parsley and Jakutsk snowparsley, after the Russian town Jakutsk. It is native to Russia, Alaska, and the Northwest Territories, Yukon, and British Columbia in Canada.

Light purple to white umbels bloom from late June to August, each with five lanceolate bracts. The fruits are ovate. The lower leaves are glabrous, bi- to tripinnate, and borne on petioles, while the upper leaves are nearly sessile to sessile. The stems are split at the caudex and are up to 60 centimeters tall.

This species grows in wet areas such as meadows and riverbanks, and on gravelly slopes.
