= Xanthotoxol =

Names
- IUPAC name 9-Hydroxy-7H-furo[3,2-g][1]benzopyran-7-one
- Other names 8-Hydroxypsoralen; 8-Hydroxypsoralene; 8-Hydroxyfuranocoumarin

Identifiers
CAS Number	2009-24-7
3D model (JSmol)	Interactive image
ChemSpider	58600
ECHA InfoCard	100.016.295
PubChem CID	65090
UNII	8RL486L8A5
CompTox Dashboard (EPA)	DTXSID50173910
- InChI: InChI=1S/C11H6O4/c12-8-2-1-6-5-7-3-4-14-10(7)9(13)11(6)15-8/h1-5,13H Key: JWVYQQGERKEAHW-UHFFFAOYSA-N; InChI=1/C11H6O4/c12-8-2-1-6-5-7-3-4-14-10(7)9(13)11(6)15-8/h1-5,13H Key: JWVYQQGERKEAHW-UHFFFAOYAF
- SMILES: C1=CC(=O)OC2=C(C3=C(C=CO3)C=C21)O

Properties
Chemical formula	C_{11}H_{6}O_{4}
Molar mass	202.16 g/mol
- Except where otherwise noted, data are given for materials in their standard state (at 25 °C [77 °F], 100 kPa). Infobox references

Xanthotoxol is a furanocoumarin. It is one of the major active ingredients in Cnidium monnieri.

== Metabolism ==
Xanthotoxol O-methyltransferase (8-hydroxyfuranocoumarin 8-O-methyltransferase) is an enzyme that uses S-adenosyl methionine and xanthotoxol to produce S-adenosylhomocysteine and O-methylxanthotoxol (xanthotoxin or methoxsalen).
