= 8-hydroxyfuranocoumarin 8-O-methyltransferase =

Class of enzymes

Identifiers
- EC no.: 2.1.1.70
- CAS no.: 67339-13-3

Databases
- IntEnz: IntEnz view
- BRENDA: BRENDA entry
- ExPASy: NiceZyme view
- KEGG: KEGG entry
- MetaCyc: metabolic pathway
- PRIAM: profile
- PDB structures: RCSB PDB PDBe PDBsum
Search
- PMC: articles
- PubMed: articles
- NCBI: proteins

8-hydroxyfuranocoumarin 8-O-methyltransferase (EC 2.1.1.70, furanocoumarin 8-methyltransferase, furanocoumarin 8-O-methyl-transferase, xanthotoxol 8-O-methyltransferase, XMT, SAM:xanthotoxol O-methyltransferase, S-adenosyl-L-methionine:8-hydroxyfuranocoumarin 8-O-methyltransferase, xanthotoxol methyltransferase, xanthotoxol O-methyltransferase, S-adenosyl-L-methionine:xanthotoxol O-methyltransferase, S-adenosyl-L-methionine-xanthotoxol O-methyltransferase) is an enzyme with systematic name S-adenosyl-L-methionine:8-hydroxyfurocoumarin 8-O-methyltransferase. This enzyme catalyses the following general chemical reaction

S-adenosyl-L-methionine + an 8-hydroxyfurocoumarin $\rightleftharpoons$ S-adenosyl-L-homocysteine + an 8-methoxyfurocoumarin (general reaction)

For example, xanthotoxol is converted to methoxsalen:

xanthotoxol
+ SAM
methoxsalen
+ SAH

These are methylation reaction in which the methyl group comes from the cofactor, S-adenosyl methionine (SAM), which becomes S-adenosyl-L-homocysteine (SAH).
