= Umbelliferone =

- Chemical structure of umbelliferone

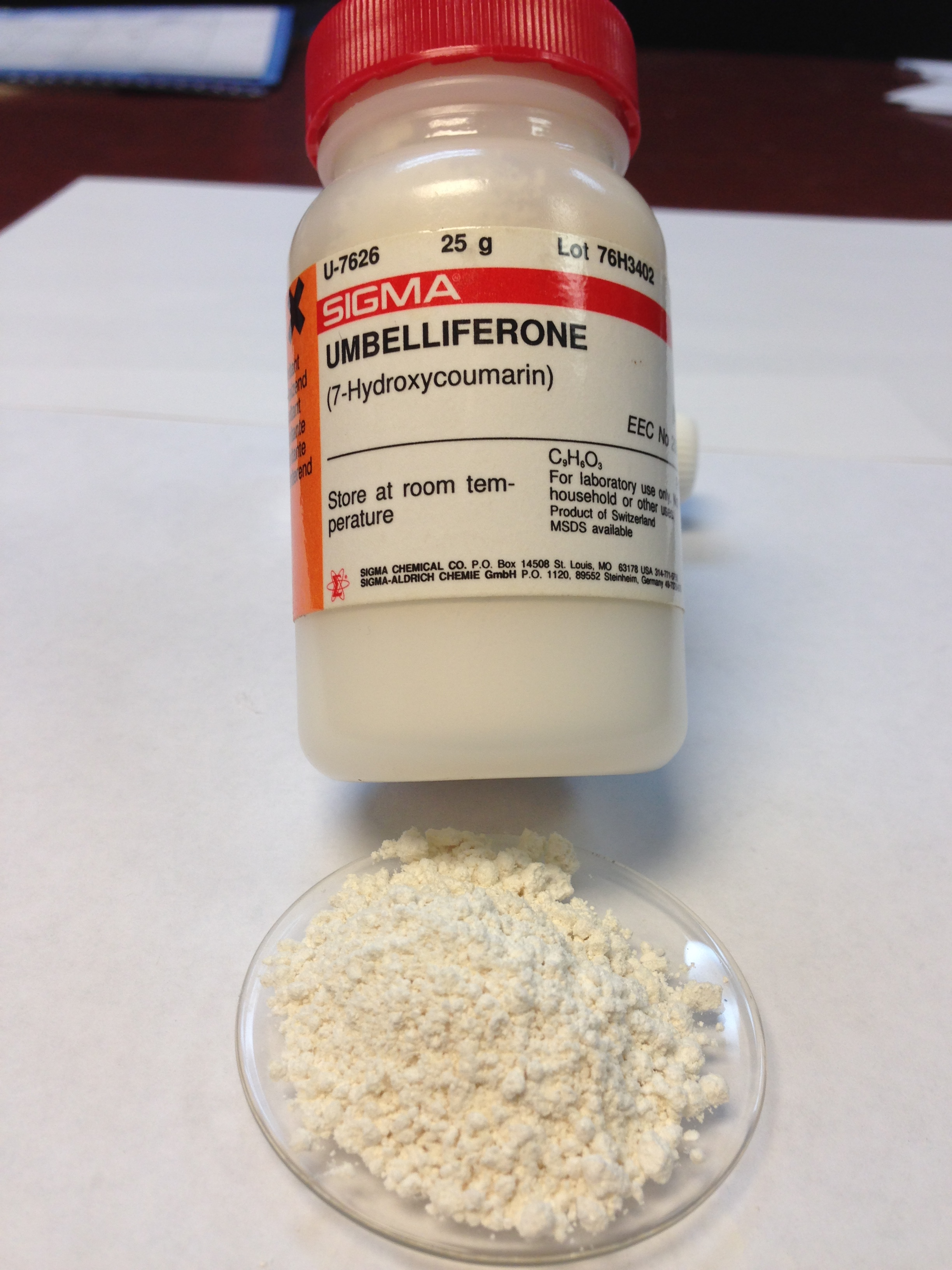

Names
- Preferred IUPAC name 7-Hydroxy-2H-1-benzopyran-2-one
- Other names 7-hydroxycoumarin, hydrangine, skimmetine, beta-umbelliferone

Identifiers
CAS Number	93-35-6
3D model (JSmol)	Interactive image
ChEBI	CHEBI:27510
ChEMBL	ChEMBL51628
ChemSpider	4444774
ECHA InfoCard	100.002.038
PubChem CID	5281426
UNII	60Z60NTL4G
CompTox Dashboard (EPA)	DTXSID5052626
- InChI: InChI=1S/C9H6O3/c10-7-3-1-6-2-4-9(11)12-8(6)5-7/h1-5,10H Key: ORHBXUUXSCNDEV-UHFFFAOYSA-N; InChI=1/C9H6O3/c10-7-3-1-6-2-4-9(11)12-8(6)5-7/h1-5,10H Key: ORHBXUUXSCNDEV-UHFFFAOYAL
- SMILES: c1cc(cc2c1ccc(=O)o2)O

Properties
Chemical formula	C_{9}H_{6}O_{3}
Molar mass	162.14 g/mol
Appearance	yellowish-white crystalline odorless powder
Melting point	230 °C (446 °F; 503 K) (decomposes)
Magnetic susceptibility (χ)	−88.22·10^{−6} cm^{3}/mol
- Except where otherwise noted, data are given for materials in their standard state (at 25 °C [77 °F], 100 kPa). verify (what is ?) Infobox references

Umbelliferone, also known as 7-hydroxycoumarin, hydrangine, skimmetine, and beta-umbelliferone, is a natural product of the coumarin family.

It absorbs ultraviolet light strongly at several wavelengths. There are some indications that this chemical is antimutagenic, it is used in sunscreens. Umbelliferone has been reported to have antioxidant properties.

It is a yellowish-white crystalline solid that has a slight solubility in hot water, but high solubility in ethanol.

== Natural occurrences and name ==
Umbelliferone's name is from the umbelliferae family of plants, and the plant family in turn was named for their umbrella-shaped inflorescences, each called an umbel.

Umbelliferone occurs in many familiar plants from the Apiaceae (Umbelliferae) family such as carrot, coriander and garden angelica, as well as in plants from other families, such as the mouse-ear hawkweed (Hieracium pilosella, Asteraceae) or the bigleaf hydrangea (Hydrangea macrophylla, Hydrangeaceae, under the name hydrangine).

It is one of the components of asafoetida, the dried latex from the giant fennel (Ferula communis).

It is also found in Justicia pectoralis (Acanthaceae).

== Biosynthesis ==
Umbelliferone is a phenylpropanoid and as such is synthesized from L-phenylalanine, which in turn is produced via the shikimate pathway. Phenylalanine is lyased into cinnamic acid, followed by hydroxylation by cinnamate 4-hydroxylase to yield 4-coumaric acid. The 4-coumaric acid is again hydroxylated by cinnamate/coumarate 2-hydroxylase to yield 2,4-dihydroxy-cinnamic acid (umbellic acid) followed by a bond rotation of the unsaturated bond adjacent to the carboxylic acid group. Finally an intramolecular attack from the hydroxyl group of C2' to the carboxylic acid group closes the ring and forms the lactone umbelliferone.

$$\begin{matrix}{}\\\xrightarrow\mathrm{PAL}\\{}\end{matrix}$$
$$\begin{matrix}{}\\\xrightarrow\mathrm{C4H}\\{}\end{matrix}$$
$$\begin{matrix}{}\\\xrightarrow\mathrm{C2H}\\{}\end{matrix}$$
$\longrightarrow$

== Chemical synthesis ==
Umbelliferone is traditionally synthesized using the Pechmann condensation, from resorcinol and formylacetic acid (generated from malic acid in situ).

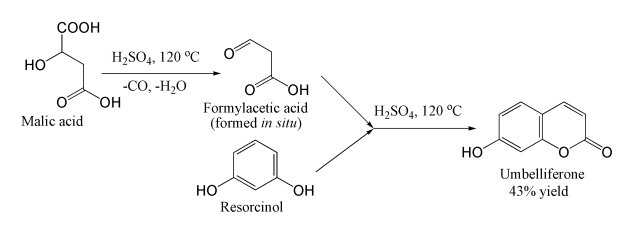
The Pechmann condensation as applied to umbelliferone

A newer synthesis uses methyl propionate and a palladium catalyst.

== Ultraviolet fluorescence ==
Umbelliferone absorbs strongly at 300, 305 and 325 nm, with log ε values of 3.9, 3.95 and 4.15 respectively, and it fluoresces blue in both ultraviolet and visible light. The powerful absorption at three different wavelengths, coupled with the fact that the energy is dissipated safely as visible light, make umbelliferone a useful sunscreen agent. The absorption changes in alkaline solution, since the phenolic hydroxyl group is deprotonated (pK_{a} = 7.7).

== Uses ==
The ultraviolet activity of umbelliferone led to its use as a sunscreen agent, and an optical brightener for textiles. It has also been used as a gain medium for dye lasers. Umbelliferone can be used as a fluorescence indicator for metal ions such as copper and calcium. It acts as a pH indicator in the range 6.5-8.9.

Umbelliferone is a potent inhibitor of type 3 17β-hydroxysteroid dehydrogenase, the primary enzyme responsible for the conversion of 4-androstene-3,17-dione to testosterone, with IC50 of 1.4 μM.

== Derivatives ==
Umbelliferone is the parent compound for a large number of natural products. Herniarin (7-O-methylumbelliferone or 7-methoxycoumarin) occurs in the leaves of water hemp (Eupatorium ayapana) and rupturewort (Herniaria). O-Glycosylated derivatives such as skimmin (7-O-β-D-glucopyranosylumbelliferone) occur naturally and are used for the fluorimetric determination of glycoside hydrolase enzymes. Isoprenylated derivatives are also widespread, such as marmin (found in grapefruit skin and in the bark of the Bael tree) and furocoumarins such as marmesin, angelicin, and psoralen.

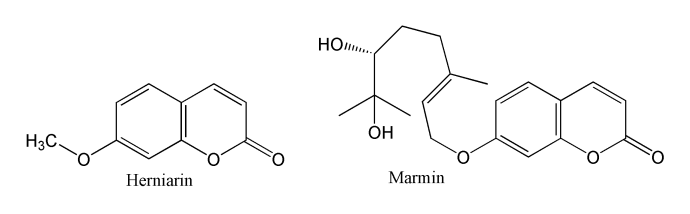
Herniarin and marmin, umbelliferone derivatives

Umbelliferone 7-apiosylglucoside can be isolated from the root of Gmelina arborea.

== See also ==
- Aesculetin
- Laser dyes
