= Vaginol =

Identifiers
CAS Number	26992-52-9
3D model (JSmol)	Interactive image
ChemSpider	9992511
PubChem CID	11817856 vaginidiol
UNII	(+)-: DB6SNE9JN2; (±)-: ZN6SR56RCP
CompTox Dashboard (EPA)	DTXSID301336811
- InChI: InChI=1S/C14H14O5/c1-14(2,17)13-11(16)10-8(18-13)5-3-7-4-6-9(15)19-12(7)10/h3-6,11,13,16-17H,1-2H3/t11-,13+/m1/s1 Key: DQISGWRLCDLKJI-YPMHNXCESA-N
- SMILES: CC(C)([C@@H]1[C@@H](c2c(ccc3c2oc(=O)cc3)O1)O)O

Properties
Chemical formula	C_{14}H_{14}O_{5}
Molar mass	262.261 g·mol^{−1}
- Except where otherwise noted, data are given for materials in their standard state (at 25 °C [77 °F], 100 kPa). Infobox references

Vaginol is a chemical compound of the furanocoumarin class. Its glucoside is apterin.

It has been prepared by the following reaction sequence:

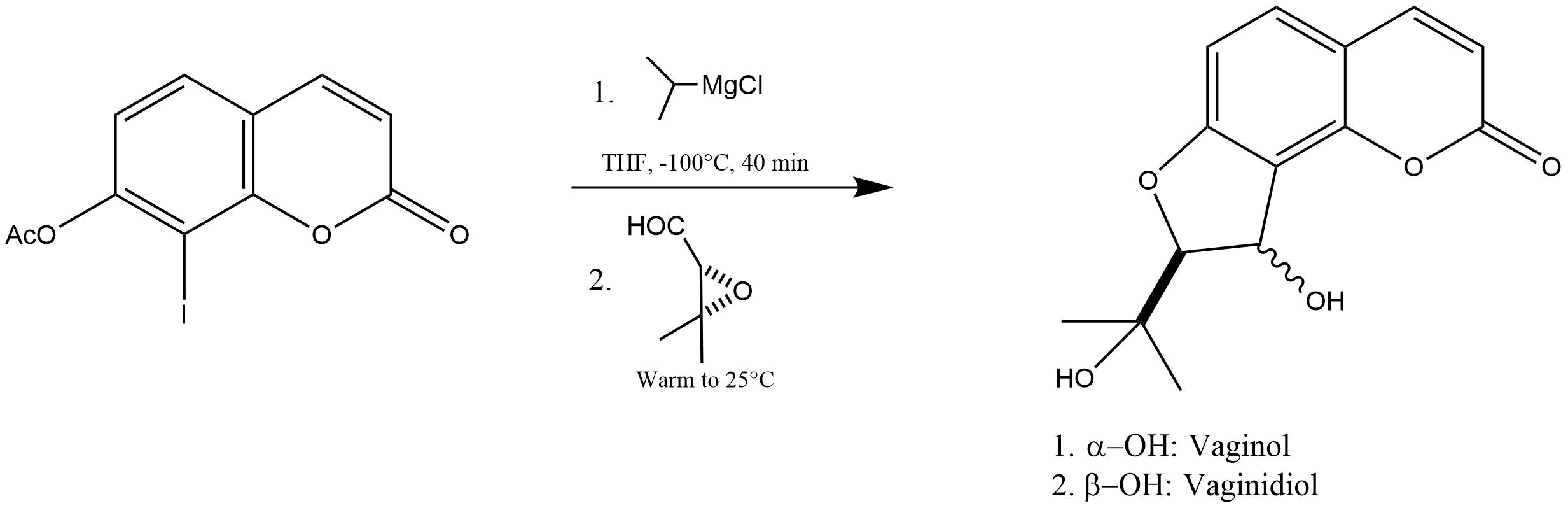
