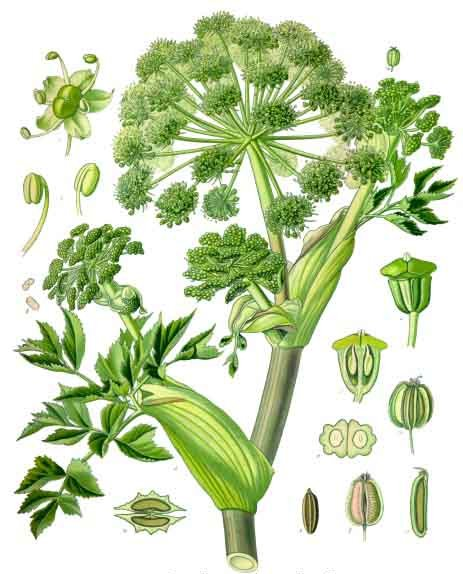

Scientific classification
- Kingdom: Plantae
- Clade: Tracheophytes
- Clade: Angiosperms
- Clade: Eudicots
- Clade: Asterids
- Order: Apiales
- Family: Apiaceae
- Genus: Angelica
- Species: A. archangelica

Binomial name
- Angelica archangelica L.

Synonyms
- Synonyms list: Angelica commutata (C.A.Mey. ex Rupr.) M.Hiroe; Angelica discocarpa (Fr.) M.Hiroe; Angelica intermedia Schult. ex Steud.; Angelica norwegica (Rupr.) Nyman; Angelica officinalis Moench; Angelica procera Salisb.; Angelica sativa Mill.; Archangelica commutata C.A.Mey. ex Rupr.; Archangelica discocarpa Fr.; Archangelica littoralis C.Agardh ex DC.; Archangelica norwegica Rupr.; Archangelica officinalis Hoffm.; Archangelica officinalis subsp. littoralis (C.Agardh ex DC.) Dostál; Archangelica officinalis monstr. phyllomana Lange; Archangelica sativa (Mill.) Besser; Archangelica slavica G.Reuss; Archangelica spuria Wahlenb.; Ligusticum angelica Stokes; Selinum archangelica (L.) Vest

= Angelica archangelica =

Species of plant

Angelica archangelica, commonly known as angelica, garden angelica, wild celery, and Norwegian angelica, is a biennial plant from the family Apiaceae, a subspecies of which is cultivated for its sweetly scented edible stems and roots. Like several other species in Apiaceae, its appearance is similar to several poisonous species (Conium, Heracleum, and others), and should not be consumed unless it has been identified with absolute certainty. Synonyms include Archangelica officinalis Hoffm. and Angelica officinalis Moench.

== Description and distribution ==
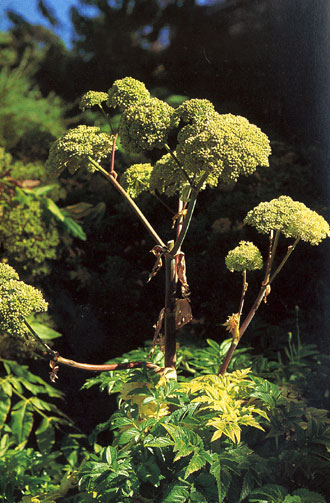
Angelica archangelica

During its first year, it grows only leaves, but during its second year, its fluted stem can reach a height of 2.5 meters (just over 8 feet), and the root is used in flavoring preparations. Its leaves consist of numerous small leaflets divided into three principal groups, each of which is again subdivided into three lesser groups. The edges of the leaflets are finely toothed or serrated. The flowers, which blossom in July, are small and numerous, yellowish or greenish, are grouped into large, globular umbels that bear pale yellow, oblong fruits. Angelica grows only in damp soil, preferably near rivers or deposits of water.

Angelica archangelica grows wild in Russia, Finland, Sweden, Norway, Denmark, Greenland, the Faroe Islands, and Iceland, mostly in the northern parts of the countries. It is cultivated in France, mainly in the Marais Poitevin, a marsh region close to Niort in the department Deux-Sèvres. Commercially available angelica is often sourced from Hungary, Romania, Bulgaria, Germany and Poland.

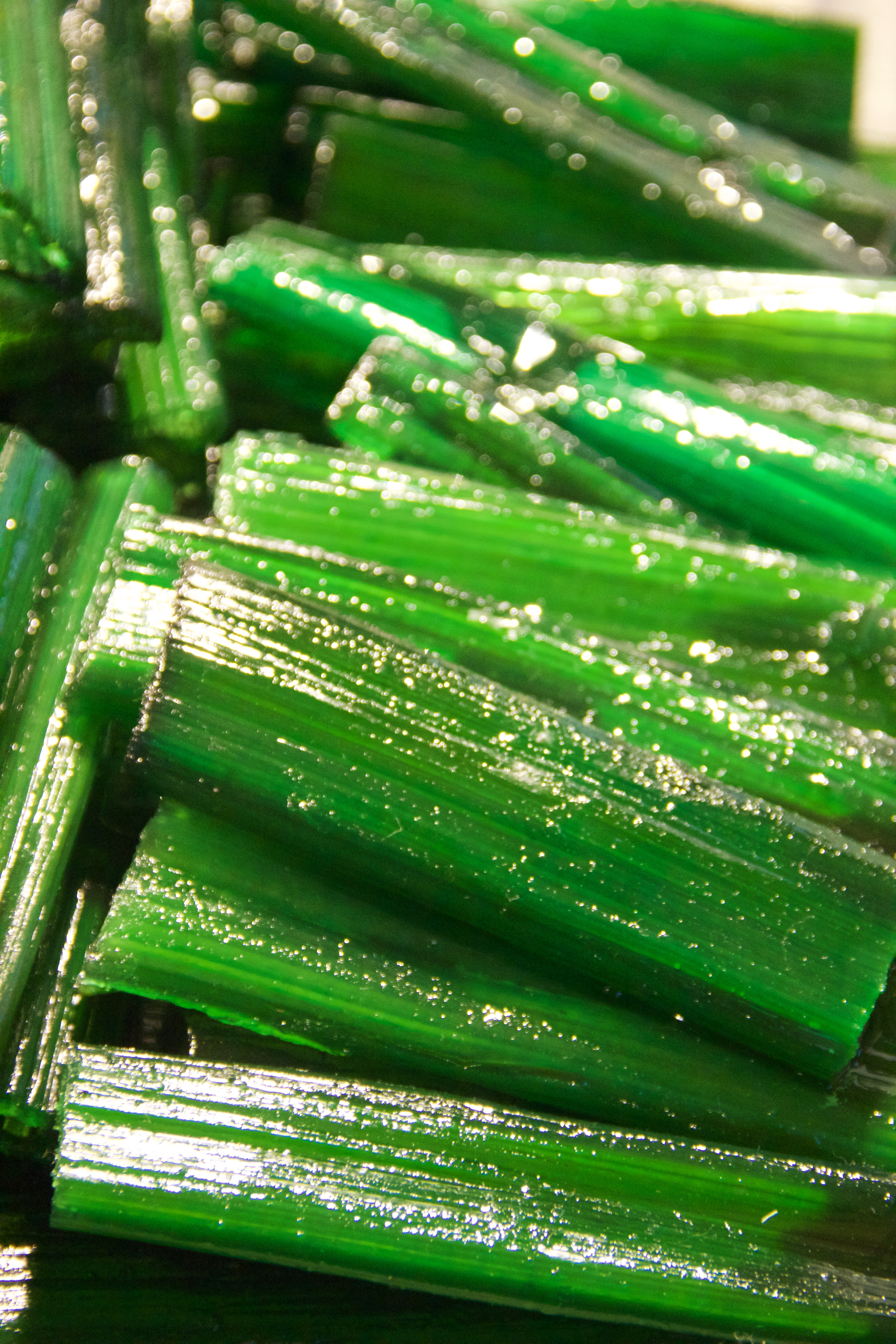
Candied angelica

== Use and history ==
From the 10th century on, angelica was cultivated as a vegetable and medicinal plant, and became popular in Scandinavia in the 12th century and is used especially in Sámi culture. It was once used as an herb in Sámi cooking, and known as kvanne.

It is used to flavor liqueurs or aquavits, (e.g., Chartreuse, Bénédictine, Vermouth, and Dubonnet), omelettes and trout, and as jam. The long bright-green stems are also candied and used as food decoration. Angelica is unique among the Umbelliferae for its pervading aromatic odor, a pleasant perfume entirely different from fennel, parsley, anise, caraway, or chervil. It has been compared to musk and to juniper. Angelica archangelica roots are among the most common botanicals used in gin distillation, often used in concert with juniper berries and coriander as a chief aromatic characteristic for gin. They are also used in absinthes, aquavits, and bitters. The hollow stems of Angelica archangelica may be eaten. The stems are picked clean of their leaves, crystallized in sugar syrup and colored green as cake decoration or as candy.

== Chemical composition ==
The essential oil content of angelica root varies based on the age of the roots. Generally, the roots have high levels of terpenes, including α-pinene and β-phellandrene. Studies have found upwards of over eighty different aroma compounds present in samples. Of particular interest to perfumers and aroma chemists is cyclopentadecanolide, which although present in small quantities (< 1% in roots, <.5% in seeds), gives angelica root a distinctive musky aroma. The roots are generally preferred for culinary and aroma uses.

Angelica seeds have a similar chemical composition to the roots, including α-pinene, β-pinene, camphene, myrcene, β-phellandrene, limonene, caryophyllene, borneol, carvone and others.

Both the seeds and roots contain coumarins and furocoumarins. Among these are 2′-angeloyl-3′-isovaleryl vaginate, archangelicin, oxypeucedanin hydrate, bergapten, byakangelicin angelate, imperatorin, isoimperatorin, isopimpinellin, 8-[2-(3-methylbutroxy)-3-hydroxy-3-methylbutoxy]psoralen, osthol, ostruthol, oxypeucedanin, phellopterin, psoralen and xanthotoxin, can be isolated from a chloroform extract of the roots of A. archangelica as well as several heraclenol derivatives. The water root extract of A. archangelica subsp. litoralis contains adenosine, coniferin, the two dihydrofurocoumarin glycosides apterin and 1′-O-β-d-glycopyranosyl-(S)-marmesin (marmesinin), 1′-O-β-d-glucopyranosyl-(2S, 3R)-3-hydroxymarmesin and 2′-β-d-glucopyranosyloxymarmesin.

== Etymology ==
Angelica is the Latin feminine name implying "angel-like" from the mid-16th century, probably named for the plant due to its scent. Archangelica derives from "an angel of the highest order," an Old French term in the late (12th century), or from the Greek word "arkhangelos" ("chief angel").

== See also ==
- Heracleum persicum (golpar)
- Angelicin
