= Acne (disambiguation) =

Acne is acneiform eruptions. It is usually used as a synonym for acne vulgaris (common acne), but may also refer to:

== Medicine ==
- Acne aestivalis, a special kind of polymorphous light eruption induced by ultra violet A radiation
- Acne conglobata, a highly inflammatory disease presenting with comedones, nodules, abscesses, and draining sinus tracts
- Acne cosmetica, acne caused by or aggravated by cosmetics
- Acne fulminans, a severe form of acne
- Acne keloidalis nuchae, a destructive scarring folliculitis that occurs almost exclusively on the occipital scalp of people of African descent, primarily men
- Acne mechanica, an acneiform eruption observed after repetitive physical trauma to the skin such as rubbing from clothing or sports equipment
- Acne medicamentosa (drug-induced acne) (e.g., steroid acne)
- Acne miliaris necrotica, a rare condition consisting of follicular vesicopustules, sometimes occurring as solitary lesions that are usually very itchy
- Acne necrotica, primary lesions that are pruritic or painful erythematous follicular-based papules that develop central necrosis and crusting and heal with a varioliform scar
- Acne rosacea, a red rash predominantly on the face
- Acne vulgaris (common acne)
- Baby acne, a rash seen on the cheeks, chin, and forehead of infants
- Blackheads
- Chloracne, an acne-like eruption of blackheads, cysts, and pustules associated with exposure to certain halogenated aromatic compounds, such as chlorinated dioxins and dibenzofurans
- Excoriated acne, mild acne accompanied by extensive excoriations caused by scratching or squeezing pimples
- Halogen acne, caused by iodides, bromides and fluorides (halogens) that induce an acneiform eruption similar to that observed with steroids
- Hidradenitis suppurativa, chronic abscesses or boils of sweat glands and hair follicles; in the underarms, groin and buttocks, and under the breasts in women
- Infantile acne/Neonatal acne
- Lupus miliaris disseminatus faciei
- Occupational acne
- Oil acne
- Pomade acne, affecting the forehead due to misapplication of hairstyling product
- Pseudofolliculitis barbae (Acne keloidalis nuchae), a rash caused by shaving
- Tar acne, caused by exposure to tars used in industry
- Tropical acne, unusually severe acne occurring in the tropics during seasons when the weather is hot and humid
- Tycoon's cap, acne necrotica miliaris, a disease of the scalp

== Other uses ==
- Acne Studios, a Swedish fashion house
- Acne (film), a 2008 Uruguayan film directed by Federico Veiroj

== See also ==
- Acme (disambiguation)
