= Maskne =

Portmanteau of "mask" and "acne" used during the COVID-19 pandemic

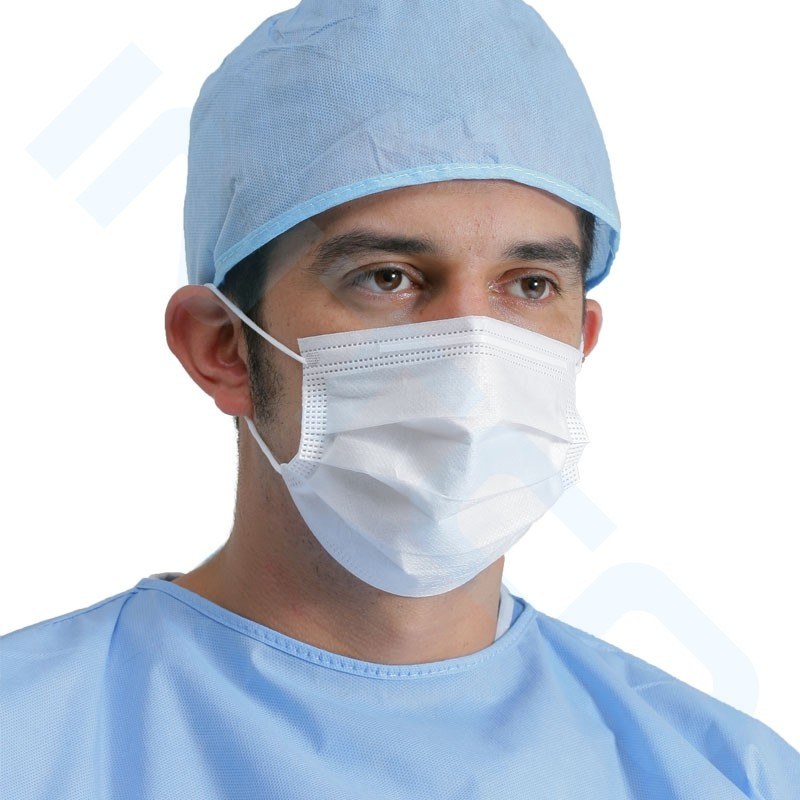
Face masks during the COVID-19 pandemic

Maskne (pronounced mask-nee and sometimes spelled mask-ne or mascne) is a portmanteau of "mask" and "acne". The term appeared in use during the COVID-19 pandemic in 2020 to refer to acne and other rashes of the face that occur in association with mask wearing. The findings are observational only and related to pressure, occlusion and friction. It is likely that several are perioral dermatitis, rosacea, seborrheic dermatitis, folliculitis, irritant contact dermatitis or allergic contact dermatitis, and acne mechanica. In one article, maskne is observed to be caused by increase of humidity in the occluded area and sebum being secreted, increasing the amount of squalene on the skin. This, along with excess sweating lead to the swelling of epidermal keratinocytes, causing acute obstruction and acne aggravation. The hot and humid environment in which maskne is induced is also apparent with tropical acne. The best treatment for maskne is to avoid wearing a mask.

== Background ==
Following the CDC's recommendations for face coverings, essential workers and those following government mask mandates reported experiencing increasing outbreaks of acne. As early as March 2020, reports were showing that at least 83% of health care workers in Hubei, China, suffered from skin irritation on the face. In June 2020, the printed use of the word "maskne" appeared in both Italian and English. In a June 2020 New York Times article, written by Courtney Rubin, dermatologists explain that the most common kind of maskne is acne mechanica. The term "maskne" was also used by BBC News in July 2020. In September 2020, the National Society for Cutaneous Medicine published the article "Maskne: Exacerbation or Eruption of Acne During the COVID-19 Pandemic". In July 2021, an article written by Amy Sheehan, Tessa Mapstone, and Sheridan Stewart on ABC News (Australia) reported on the increase of "maskne" from mandatory mask rules.
