= C22H24N2O8 =

The molecular formula C_{22}H_{24}N_{2}O_{8} (molar mass: 444.43 g/mol, exact mass: 444.1533 u) may refer to:

- Tetracycline
- Doxycycline
