= Iododerma =

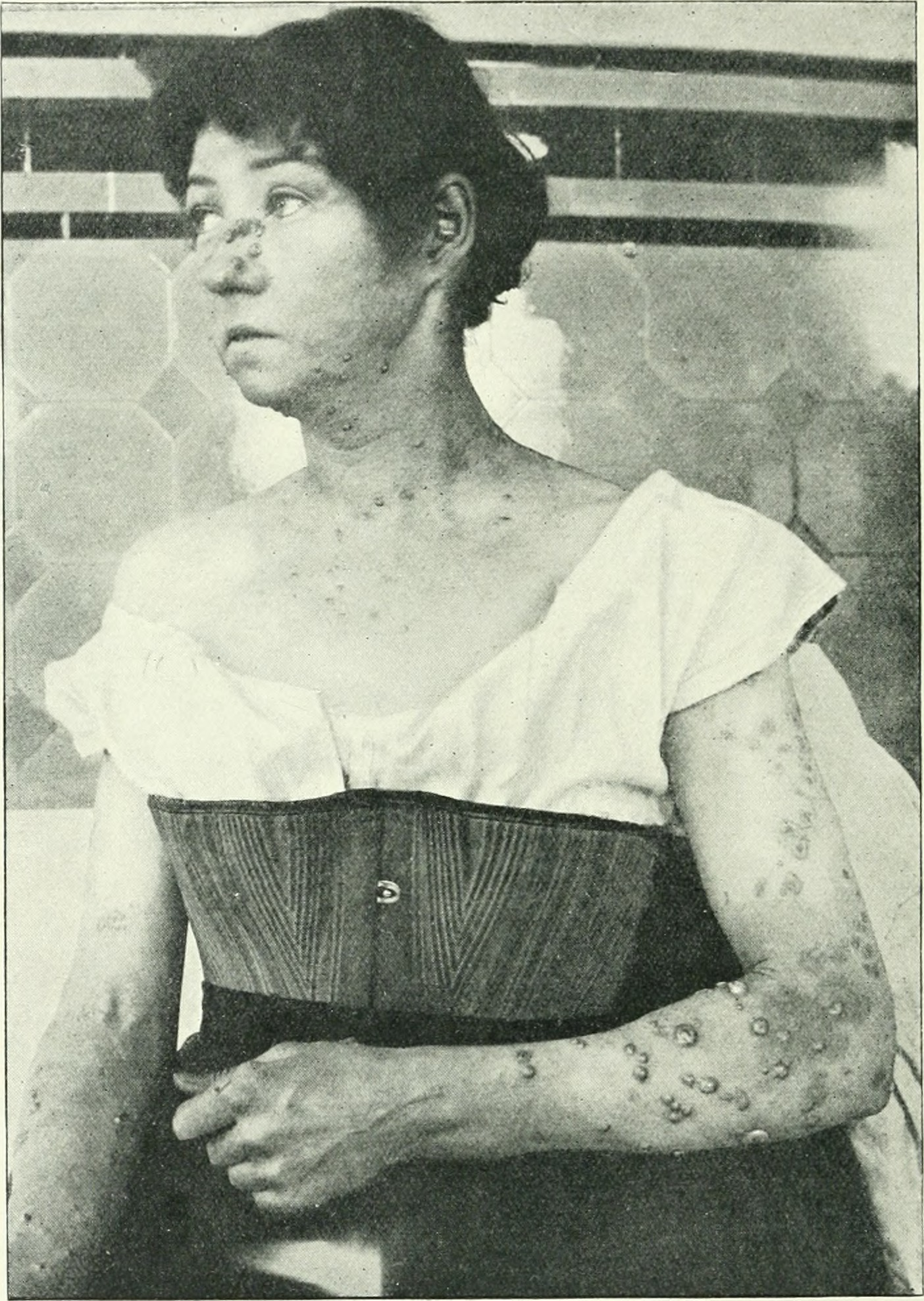
- Granulomatous iododermia
- Specialty: Dermatology

Iododermas are caused by iodides, with the most common sources of exposure being oral and intravenous contrast materials used to treat thyroid disease. The most common type of eruption is an acneiform eruption with numerous acutely inflamed follicular pustules, each surrounded by a ring of hyperemia.

== See also ==
- Skin lesion
- List of cutaneous conditions
