= TetTag =

Mouse line used in memory research

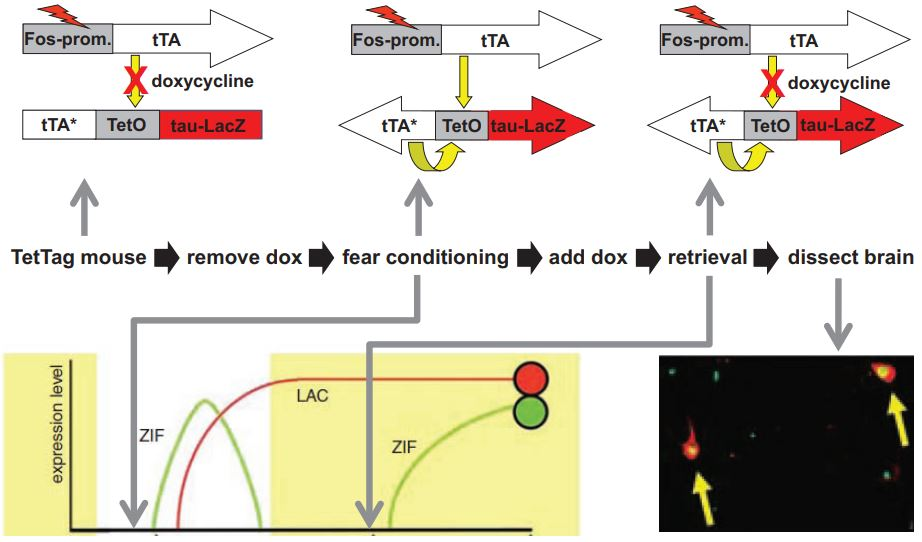
Using the TetTag mouse for memory research. During fear conditioning, doxycycline is removed from the food to allow the interaction between tTA and the LacZ labeling system. Later memory retrieval activates another immediate early gene (Zif). In this example, two neurons carry the red and the nuclear green label, indicating that these neurons were active during memory storage (red) and again during retrieval (green).

The TetTag mouse is a bi-transgenic mutant used in neuroscience research that expresses a persistent marker (e.g. beta-galactosidase) under control of the immediate early gene fos. This mouse strain allows the stable labeling of activated neurons in mice in a defined time window of several hours.

== Description ==
Two independently generated transgenic strains were crossed to produce the TetTag strain. In the first transgenic construct, the tetracycline-controlled transactivator (tTA) protein and a two hour half-life Green Fluorescent Protein (shEGFP) are expressed under the direction of the fos minimal promoter. The second transgenic construct expresses a nuclear-localizing beta-galactosidase gene and the tetracycline regulated transactivator (tTA) under the control of the TetO tetracycline-responsive regulatory element.

== Memory research ==
The TetTag mouse allows researchers to label activated neurons during a learning experiment (e.g. fear conditioning, water maze training). When the memory is retrieved days later, the acutely activated neurons can be labeled by immunohistochemistry against immediate early genes. These experiments test whether the same neurons are responsible for storing and retrieving a memory, a key question to understand the cellular mechanism of memory.

== Limitations ==
The removal of doxycycline from the chow opens the window for activity-dependent labeling, but it takes several hours for the drug to be cleared from the brain. Thus, the labeling window is not very precise in time. Also, it is not entirely clear which activity patterns lead to Fos activation in neurons.
