= Acne medicamentosa =

- Other names: Drug induced acne
- Specialty: Dermatology

Acne medicamentosa is acne that is caused or aggravated by medication. Because acne is generally a disorder of the pilosebaceous units caused by hormones, the medications that trigger acne medicamentosa most frequently are hormone analogs. It is also often caused by corticosteroids; in this case, it is referred to as steroid acne.

Although the masculinizing hormone testosterone is most often blamed, and although men with acne secondary to bodybuilding hormones are seen from time to time, the major hormonal medications that cause acne are the progestin analogues present in hormonal contraception. Other medications can produce acneiform eruptions (usually pimply bumps and pustules that look like acne).

Some conditions mimic acne medicamentosa. The most common mimic is folliculitis produced by an overgrowth of the Malassezia species, often secondary to oral or systemic corticosteroids, or secondary to broad-spectrum antibiotics such as the tetracycline family used in acne. This is often misinterpreted as 'tetracycline-resistant acne'.

== See also ==
- Drug eruption
- List of cutaneous conditions
- Steroid rosacea
