= Gram-negative rosacea =

- Specialty: Dermatology

Gram-negative rosacea is a cutaneous condition that clinically looks like stage II or III rosacea.

== See also ==
- List of cutaneous conditions
