= Tamoxifen-induced gene expression =

Tamoxifen-induced gene expression is a method used in molecular biology and neuroscience to activate transcription of a specific gene by application of the drug tamoxifen. It is based on the expression of a mutated estrogen receptor (ER^{T2}) fused to Cre recombinase, an inducible gene expression system. In the absence of tamoxifen, the receptor is inactive and sequestered in the cytoplasm. When tamoxifen is administered, it binds to ER^{T2}, causing the Cre-ER^{T2} fusion protein to move into the cell's nucleus, where it can perform its recombination function. The gene of interest, encoding e.g. the fluorescent protein GFP, contains a LoxP-flanked stop cassette that prevents expression unless it is excised by Cre recombinase.

When used in mice, the Cre-ER^{T2} system allows for excellent temporal control: Administration of tamoxifen triggers genetic changes at a precise time point in development or adult life. However, depending on the type of target cell, the gene of interest may not be successfully activated in every cell, leading to mosaic expression.

== TRAP2 mice to label active neurons ==
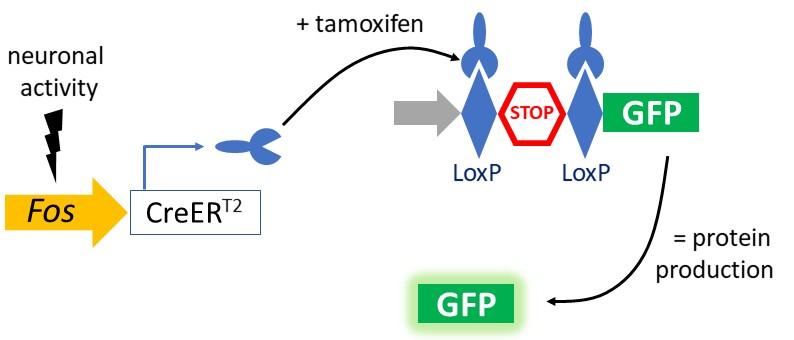
Function of the TRAP mouse: Neuronal activity activates the Fos promoter, producing CreER that is sequestered in the cytoplasm. Upon tamoxifen binding, CreER enters the nucleus and excises the Lox-stop-Lox cassette from the gene of interest (here GFP). As a result, active neurons become fluorescent.

The Cre-ER^{T2} system has been harnessed to express genes of interest, e.g. fluorescent markers or optogenetic tools, in highly active neurons. For this purpose, it is driven by the immediate early gene Fos. This approach, called Targeted Recombination in Active Populations (TRAP, TRAP2), is used to investigate learning and memory in mice on the cellular level.

== Similar inducer systems ==
- Tetracycline-controlled transcriptional activation, an alternative method to activate genes using the antibiotic tetracycline. Note that dependent on dosage, mouse strain and sex, both tetracycline and tamoxifen can alter the behavior of mice.
- TetTag mice use the tetracycline transactivator to label Fos-expressing neurons.

== History ==
Cre-ER^{T2} was first described in 1997. It consists of Cre fused to a modified human estrogen receptor alpha with the triple ligand-binding domain mutation G400V/M543A/L544A. There was also a weaker version, Cre-ER^{T} (G400V/L539A/L540A). The combination was originally described as a way to cause tamoxifen-induced site-specific mutagenesis.

== See also ==
- Regulation of gene expression
