= Richard Gallo =

American immunologist and dermatologist (born 1958)

Richard L. Gallo
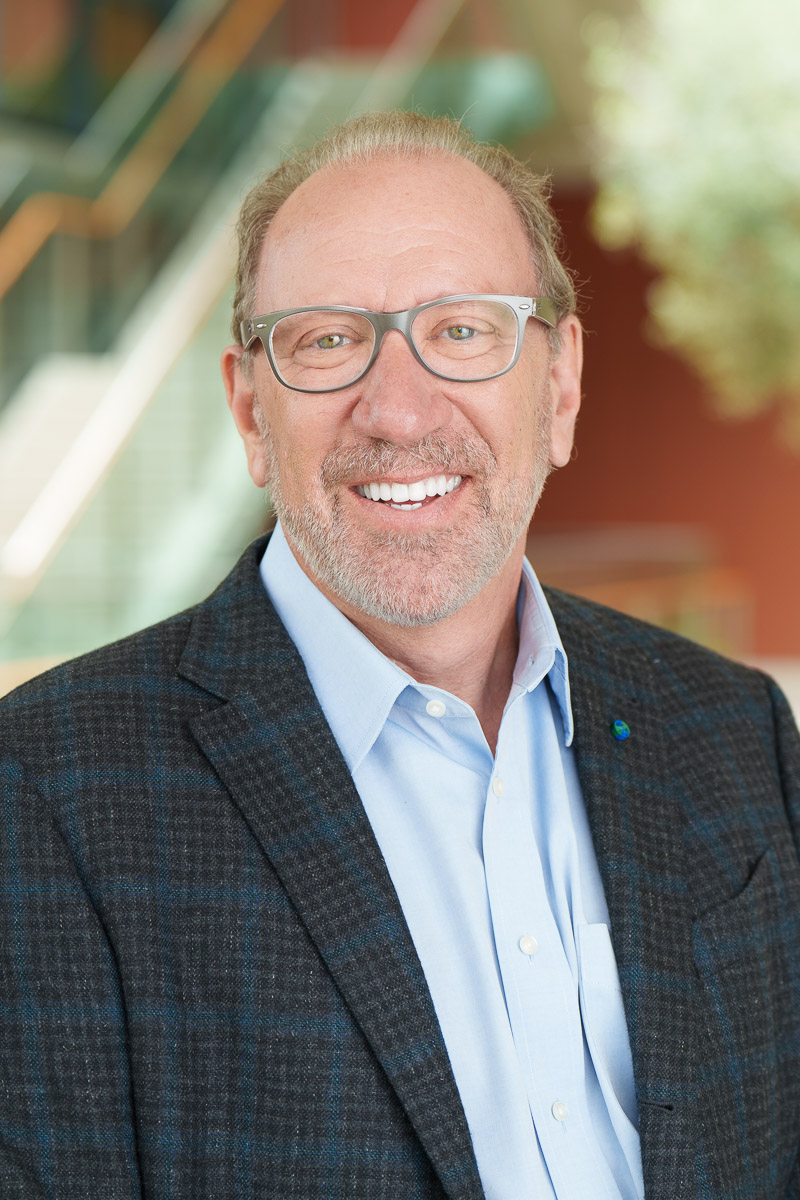
- Born: December 9, 1958 (age 67); United States
- Occupations: Professor, Immunologist, Microbiologist, Dermatologist
- Known for: Antimicrobial Peptides, Microbiome

Richard L. Gallo is an American immunologist, microbiologist and dermatologist who is a Distinguished Professor and founding Chair of Dermatology at the University of California, San Diego. He has worked on antimicrobial peptides in mammalian skin, links between innate immunity and skin diseases such as atopic dermatitis and rosacea, and the functions of the skin microbiome in host immune defense.

Gallo's discoveries have earned him international acclaim and include the first report of the presence of antimicrobial peptides in mammalian skin. His interdisciplinary work in immunology, dermatology, microbiology and general internal medicine has advanced understanding of the pathophysiology of several diseases including Rosacea, Atopic Dermatitis, Acne, and systemic comorbidities associated with dermatologic diseases. Included among several prestigious awards, Gallo has been elected a member of the US National Academy of Medicine, a fellow of the American Association for the Advancement of Science, a fellow of the American Society for Microbiology and an international fellow of the Royal College of Physicians (London).

== Education ==
Gallo did his undergraduate studies at the University of Chicago, earned his MD and PhD at the University of Rochester, interned in Pediatrics at Johns Hopkins Hospital, was a Dermatology resident at Harvard Medical School and was a postdoctoral fellow at Harvard University under the supervision of Merton Bernfield'

== Research ==
Gallo studies how humans interact with the environment and protect themselves from infection. He discovered that antimicrobial peptides are present in mammalian skin by demonstrating that cathelicidin antimicrobial peptides(Cathelicidins) are present during wound repair. Subsequent work from his laboratory used molecular techniques to produce a knock out mouse that has shown how cathelicidin antimicrobials protect against infection in several organs including the skin. By using a wide variety of biochemical and genetic tools his work has also shown that other antimicrobial peptides and elements of innate immunity such as Toll-like receptors and Hyaluronan influence human health. His work has translated into a new understanding of the cause of rosacea, a finding with immediate therapeutic implications. Most recently his research has defined biochemical mechanisms through which Vitamin D and the normal skin microflora Microbiome can control immune responses. These latest findings have advanced understanding of the Hygiene hypothesis, Atopic Dermatitis and Rosacea. His analysis of the function of the human skin microbiome is leading discovery of new therapeutic approaches to disease by discovering molecules from bacteria on the skin that can be used for drugs.

Several press releases and scientific publications have reported his discoveries.

== Awards and honors ==
- 1990- AMA/Archives of Dermatology Young Investigator Award
- 2002- Stern Endowment for Dermatology Research, Nobel Lectureship- Karolinska Institute
- 2003- Elected American Society for Clinical Investigation
- 2006- Montagna Award, Society for Investigative Dermatology
- 2007- CE.R.I.E.S. Award
- 2009- Stiefel Lectureship, Dermatology Foundation; Blank Lectureship, SID; Mertz award, Duhring Lectureship-U Penn
- 2010- Elected Association of American Physicians
- 2011- Rene'Touraine Award-European Society Dermatologic Research
- 2012- Sulzberger Award- American Academy of Dermatology, Lerner lecture-Yale, Gilliam Lecture-UT Southwestern
- 2013- Rook Oration, British Academy of Dermatology
- 2014- Elected American Society for Microbiology, Dohi Lectureship and Honorary membership in Japanese Dermatology Association
- 2015- Haynes Lectureship, Harvard Medical School, Rodan-Fields Lectureship, Stanford University
- 2017- Elected as a fellow of the American Association for the Advancement of Science, Newcomer Lectureship- UCLA, Lifetime Achievement Award- Manchester UK
- 2018- Named Irma Gigli Endowed Chair of Dermatology, UCSD
- 2019- NIH MERIT award
- 2022- Rothman Award, Society for Investigative Dermatology
- 2022- David Martin Carter Award, American Skin Association
- 2023- Van Scott Lectureship and Frost Award, American Academy of Dermatology
- 2023- Elected to the National Academy of Medicine
- 2024-Elected Fellow of Royal College of Physicians (London)
