= Halogenoderma =

- Specialty: Dermatology

Halogenodermas are skin eruptions that result after exposure to halogen-containing drugs or substances. This may last several weeks after drug use is discontinued. This is because of the slow elimination rate of iodides and bromides. Fluoroderma is a particular type of halogenoderma which is caused by fluoride. Fluoride is present in oral hygiene products such as toothpastes and mouth washes, hence this type of acne is seen mostly around the mouth and jawline. Acute fluoroderma has been observed in patients exposed to anaesthetics containing fluoride such as sevoflurane.

== Signs and symptoms ==
The most common presentation of halogenoderma is pustules or papulopustular lesions, which are often found on the face, neck, back, and limbs. In some cases, halogenoderma manifests as large vegetating lesions as opposed to pustular eruption.

== Cause ==
Exposure to halogens, such as iodide and bromide (also known as iododerma and bromoderma, respectively), can cause halogenoderma.

== Mechanism ==
It is still unclear what causes halogenoderma specifically. It's thought that a type 2 delayed hypersensitivity reaction is what causes it.

== Treatment ==
Iodide and bromide-containing substances should be avoided when treating halogenoderma. Lesions typically go away on their own four to six weeks after iodide or bromide intake is stopped. It is possible to use systemic corticosteroids to help these lesions heal more quickly.

== See also ==
- Halogen acne
- List of cutaneous conditions
