= Halogen acne =

- Specialty: Dermatology

Halogen acne is caused by iodides, bromides and fluorides (halogens) that induce an acneiform eruption similar to that observed with steroids.

== See also ==
- Halogenoderma
- List of cutaneous conditions
