= Tycoon's cap =

- Specialty: Dermatology

Tycoon’s cap (also known as acne necrotica miliaris) is a human disease of the scalp, classified as a mixed alopecia, characterized by minute, itchy pustules within the scalp.

== See also ==
- Skin lesion
- Cicatricial alopecia
