= Hyclate =

A hyclate (Latin: hyclas) is a pharmaceutical term for hydrochloride hemiethanolate hemihydrate (·HCl·1/2EtOH·1/2H_{2}O), e.g. doxycycline hyclate.
