= National Rosacea Society =

U.S. nonprofit organization

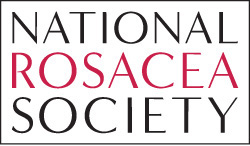
- Abbreviation: NRS
- Founded: 1992; 34 years ago
- Legal status: 501(c)(3) non-profit organization
- Headquarters: Chicago, Illinois
- Region served: United States
- Website: www.rosacea.org

The National Rosacea Society (NRS) is a 501(c) nonprofit organization dedicated to improving the lives of the estimated 16 million Americans who suffer from rosacea, a chronic facial skin disorder. Its mission is to raise awareness, provide health information, and support medical research that may lead to improvement in the management, prevention, and potential cure for rosacea.

== History ==
Although rosacea was first described by Guy de Chauliac in the 14th century and included Chaucer's The Canterbury Tales, when the National Rosacea Society was founded in 1992 rosacea was still considered a rare disease, and its first approved treatment, topical metronidazole, received orphan drug designation by the U.S. Food and Drug Administration in the belief that fewer than 200,000 Americans suffered from it. It soon became evident that rosacea affected the lives of millions, who had previously failed to realize they had a medical condition that could be treated. A 2018 study estimated global incidence of rosacea to be more than 5%, or equivalent to around 415 million.

== Awareness ==
The National Rosacea Society designates each April as Rosacea Awareness Month and conducts national communications, public relations, and social media activities throughout the year. The society also produces patient education materials.

In 2024, the Society launched a Seal of Acceptance program to identify gentle skin care and cosmetic products that have been clinically tested and evaluated to be unlikely to irritate rosacea skin.

== Support for research ==
In 1999, the National Rosacea Society launched a patient-funded research grants program to support scientific research into potential causes and other key aspects of rosacea that may lead to improvements in its management, prevention, or potential cure. Because the etiology of rosacea is unknown, a high priority in awarding grants is given to studies relating to such areas as the pathogenesis, progression, mechanism of action, cell biology, and potential genetic factors of rosacea. Research in such areas as epidemiology, predisposition, quality of life, and relationships with environmental and lifestyle factors may also be funded.

Since its inception, more than $1.5 million has been awarded to support more than 70 studies.

== Publications ==
To provide a basis for meaningful scientific investigation, the NRS organized a consensus committee and review panel of 21 medical experts to establish a standard definition and classification system for rosacea, published in 2002, as well as a standard grading system published in 2004. The classification system was instrumental in establishing the clinical subtypes—erythematotelangiectatic rosacea, papulopustular rosacea, phymatous rosacea, and ocular rosacea—commonly used to describe the disease. In 2009, an NRS consensus committee and review panel of 26 medical experts published standard management options for rosacea.

In 2017, an NRS consensus committee and review panel of 28 medical experts published an updated classification and pathophysiology of rosacea, reflecting the increased understanding of the disease and its progression gained in the 15 years since the original classification was published. The updated classification shifted focus away from subtypes to a phenotype approach to diagnosis. The article was accompanied by an editorial on rosacea comorbidities and areas for future research.

In 2020, an NRS consensus committee and review panel of 27 medical experts published updates standard management options for rosacea, intended to provide a comprehensive summary of treatment options for the respective phenotypes identified in the updated standard classification of rosacea, and recommending that physicians to tailor therapy to each patient's individual case.
