= Doxycycline =

Tetracycline-class antibiotic

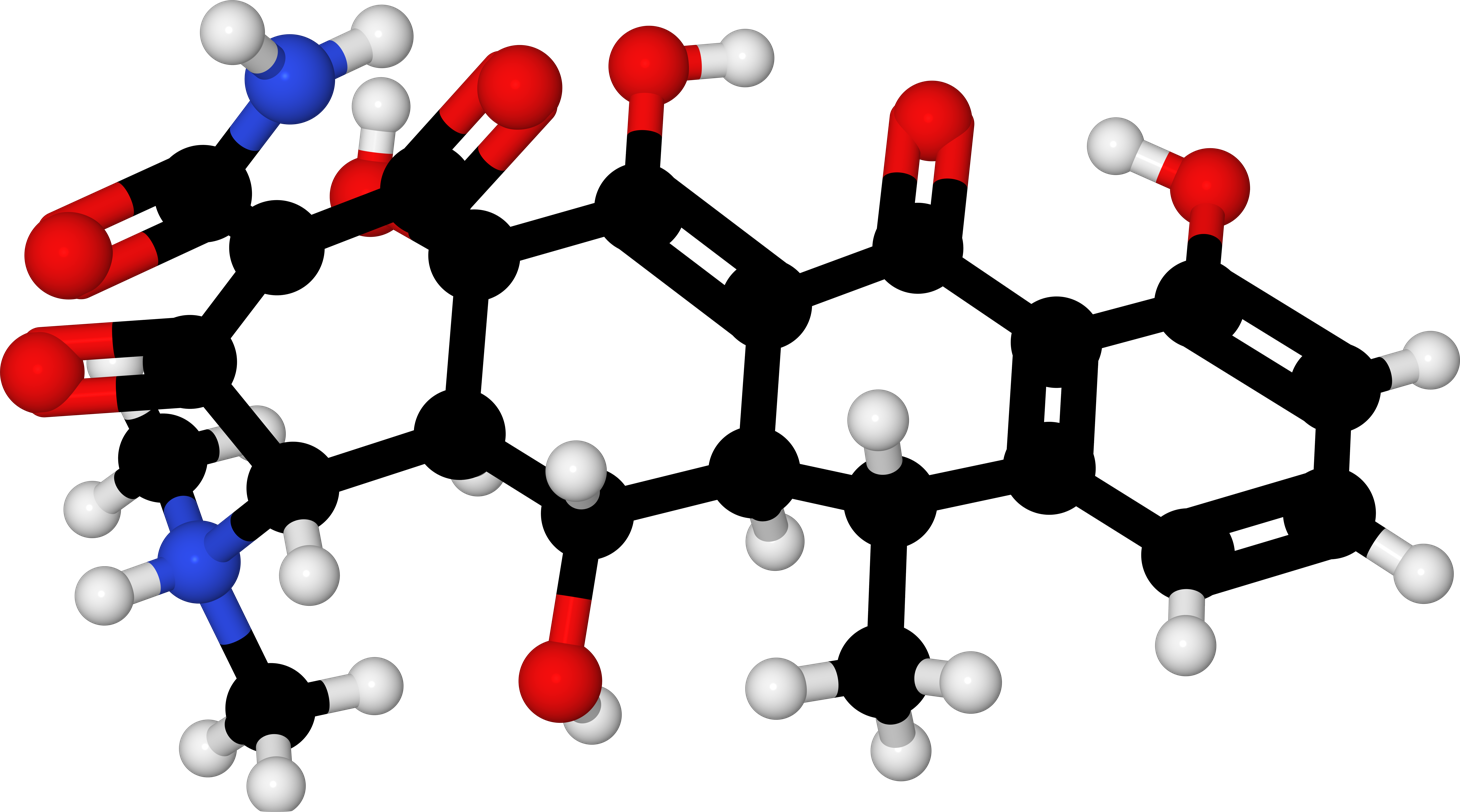

Clinical data
- Pronunciation: /ˌdɒksɪˈsaɪkliːn/ DOKS-ih-SYE-kleen
- Trade names: Vibramycin, Doryx, others
- AHFS/Drugs.com: Monograph
- MedlinePlus: a682063
- License data: US DailyMed: Doxycycline
- Pregnancy category: AU: D
- Routes of administration: By mouth, intravenous
- ATC code: J01AA02 (WHO) A01AB22 (WHO)

Legal status
- Legal status: AU: S4 (Prescription only); UK: POM (Prescription only); US: ℞-only

Pharmacokinetic data
- Bioavailability: ~100%
- Protein binding: 80–90%
- Metabolism: Negligible
- Elimination half-life: 10–22 hours
- Excretion: Mainly feces, 40% urine

Identifiers
- IUPAC name: (4S,4aR,5S,5aR,6R,12aS)-4-(Dimethylamino)-3,5,10,12,12a-pentahydroxy-6-methyl-1,11-dioxo-1,4,4a,5,5a,6,11,12a-octahydrotetracene-2-carboxamide
- CAS Number: 564-25-0
- PubChem CID: Doxycycline
- DrugBank: DB00254
- ChemSpider: 10482106
- UNII: 334895S862
- KEGG: D07876
- ChEBI: CHEBI:60648
- ChEMBL: ChEMBL1433
- CompTox Dashboard (EPA): DTXSID0037653
- ECHA InfoCard: 100.008.429

Chemical and physical data
- Formula: C_{22}H_{24}N_{2}O_{8}
- Molar mass: 444.440 g·mol^{−1}
- 3D model (JSmol): Interactive image
- SMILES: CN(C)[C@@H]3C(\O)=C(\C(N)=O)C(=O)[C@@]4(O)C(/O)=C2/C(=O)c1c(cccc1O)[C@H](C)[C@H]2[C@H](O)[C@@H]34
- InChI: InChI=1S/C22H24N2O8.H2O/c1-7-8-5-4-6-9(25)11(8)16(26)12-10(7)17(27)14-15(24(2)3)18(28)13(21(23)31)20(30)22(14,32)19(12)29;/h4-7,10,14-15,17,25,27-29,32H,1-3H3,(H2,23,31);1H2/t7-,10+,14+,15-,17-,22-;/m0./s1; Key:XQTWDDCIUJNLTR-CVHRZJFOSA-N

Doxycycline, sold under the brand names Vibramycin and Doryx, among others, is a broad-spectrum antibiotic of the tetracycline class used in the treatment of infections caused by bacteria and certain parasites. It is used to treat bacterial pneumonia, acne, chlamydia infections, Lyme disease, cholera, typhus, and syphilis, and is sometimes used to prevent malaria. Doxycycline may be taken by mouth or intravenously.

Common side effects include diarrhea, nausea, vomiting, abdominal pain, and an increased risk of sunburn. Use during pregnancy is not recommended. Doxycycline can be used in children of all ages, including for Lyme disease and rickettsial infections. Like other agents of the tetracycline class, it slows or kills bacteria by inhibiting protein production. It kills Plasmodium—microorganisms associated with malaria—by targeting a plastid organelle, the apicoplast.

Doxycycline post-exposure prophylaxis (doxyPEP) is also used to prevent sexually transmitted infections, particularly when skin or fluid contact has occurred, such as if protection was not used in men who have sex with men, and is supported by CDC guidelines.

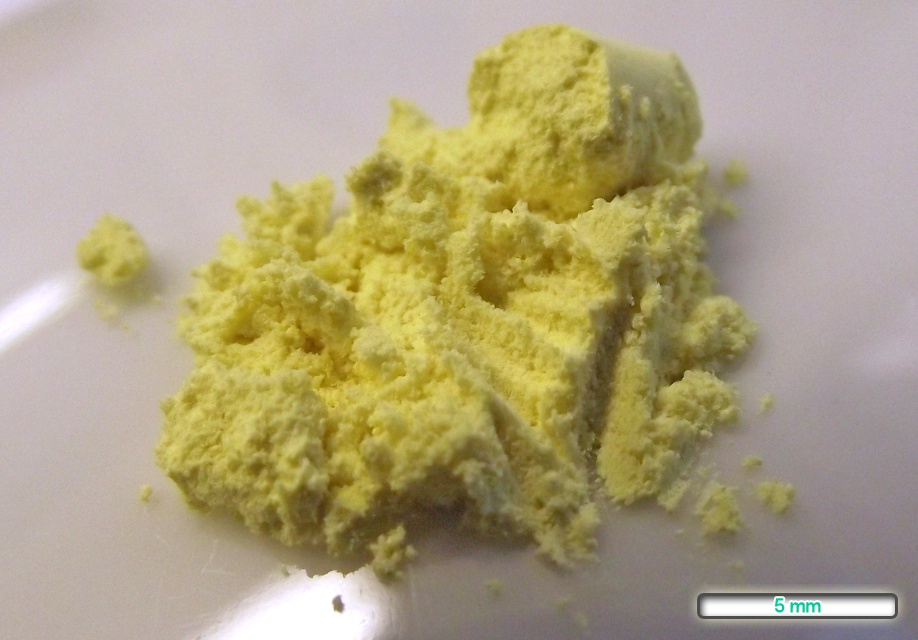
Doxycycline hyclate

Doxycycline was patented in 1957 and came into commercial use in 1967. It is on the World Health Organization's List of Essential Medicines. Doxycycline is available as a generic medicine. In 2023, it was the 77th most commonly prescribed medication in the United States, with more than 8 million prescriptions.

== Medical uses ==
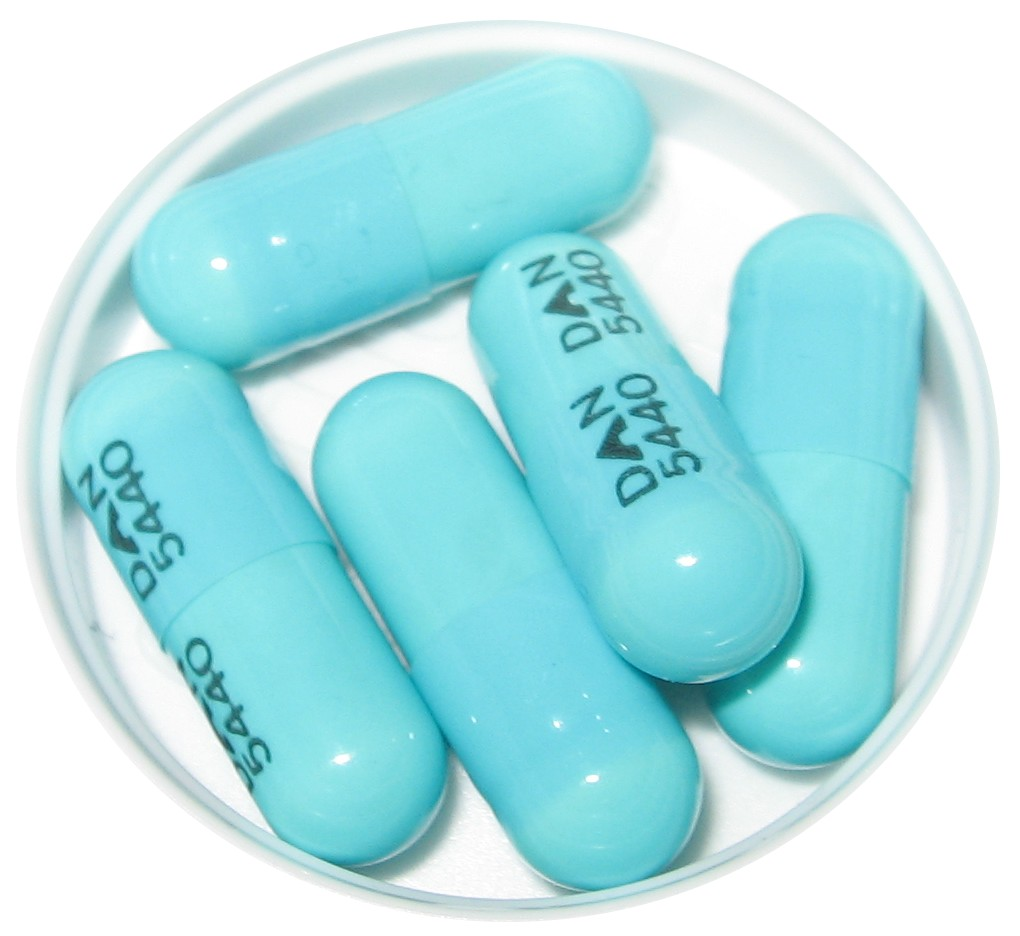
Generic 100 mg doxycycline capsules

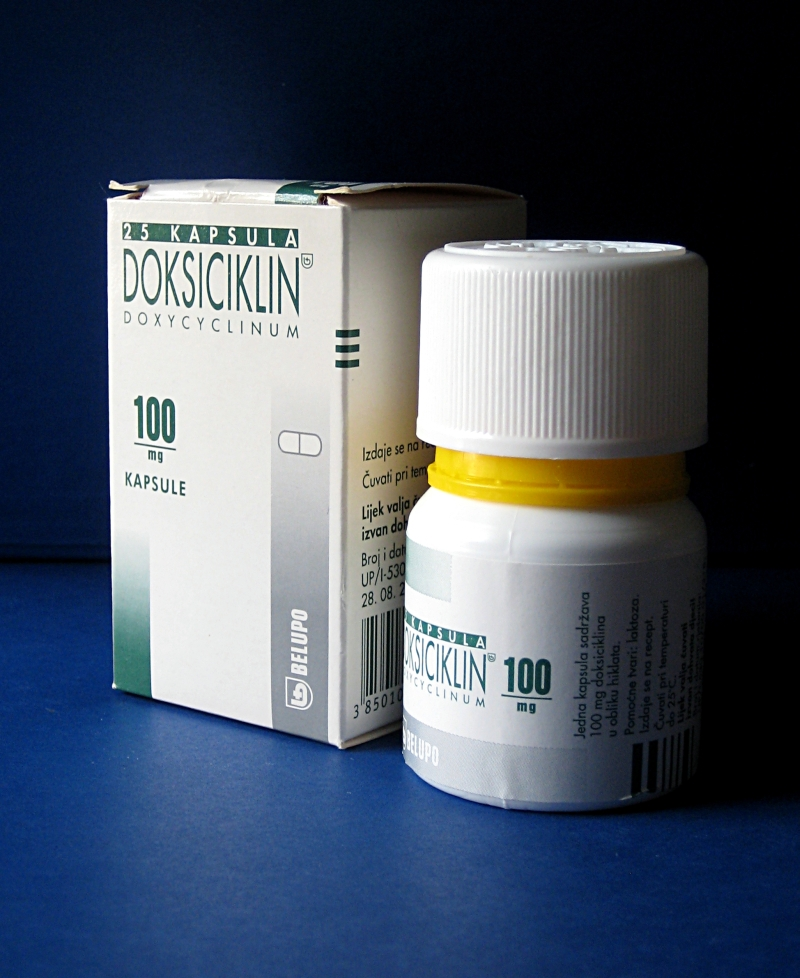
A package of generic doxycycline

Like all tetracycline antibiotics, doxycycline is indicated for susceptible Gram-positive and Gram-negative bacterial infections, including respiratory tract infections and urinary tract infections. Beyond these general tetracycline indications, doxycycline is frequently used to treat Lyme disease, chronic prostatitis, sinusitis, pelvic inflammatory disease, severe acne, rosacea, and rickettsial infections. The efficacy of oral doxycycline for treating papulopustular rosacea and adult acne is not solely based on its antibiotic properties, but also on its anti-inflammatory and anti-angiogenic properties.

=== Antibacterial ===
==== General indications ====
Doxycycline is a broad-spectrum antibiotic that is employed in the treatment of numerous bacterial infections. The drug is effective against bacteria such as Moraxella catarrhalis (a cause of respiratory tract infections), Brucella melitensis (a cause of brucellosis), Chlamydia pneumoniae (a cause of atypical pneumonia), and Mycoplasma pneumoniae (a cause of pneumonia). Additionally, doxycycline is used in the prevention and treatment of serious conditions like anthrax, leptospirosis, bubonic plague, and Lyme disease. However, some bacteria have developed resistance to doxycycline, including Haemophilus species, Mycoplasma hominis, and Pseudomonas aeruginosa.

Specifically, doxycycline is indicated for treatment of the following diseases:

- Rocky Mountain spotted fever, typhus fever and the typhus group, scrub typhus, Q fever, rickettsialpox, and tick fevers caused by Rickettsia,
- respiratory tract infections caused by Mycoplasma pneumoniae,
- Lymphogranuloma venereum, trachoma, inclusion conjunctivitis, and uncomplicated urethral, endocervical, or rectal infections in adults caused by Chlamydia trachomatis,
- psittacosis,
- non-gonococcal urethritis caused by Ureaplasma urealyticum,
- relapsing fever due to Borrelia recurrentis,
- chancroid caused by Haemophilus ducreyi,
- plague due to Yersinia pestis,
- tularemia,
- cholera,
- campylobacter fetus infections,
- brucellosis caused by Brucella species (in conjunction with streptomycin),
- bartonellosis,
- granuloma inguinale (Klebsiella species),
- Lyme disease (Borrelia species).
- Leptospirosis

==== Indications for Gram-negative bacteria ====
When bacteriologic susceptibility testing (laboratory tests confirming the bacteria are sensitive to the drug) indicates appropriate susceptibility, doxycycline may be used to treat these infections caused by Gram-negative bacteria:

- Escherichia coli infections,
- Klebsiella aerogenes infections,
- Shigella species infections,
- Acinetobacter species infections,
- respiratory tract infections caused by Haemophilus influenzae,
- respiratory tract and urinary tract infections caused by Klebsiella species.

==== Indications for Gram-positive bacteria ====
Some Gram-positive bacteria have developed resistance to doxycycline. Tetracycline resistance rates vary by geographic region; for example, resistance in Streptococcus pyogenes ranges from about 1% in Sweden to over 80% in China, and a pooled global resistance rate of approximately 67% has been reported for Enterococcus faecalis. When bacteriologic susceptibility testing indicates appropriate susceptibility to the drug, doxycycline may be used to treat these infections caused by Gram-positive bacteria:

- upper respiratory infections caused by Streptococcus pneumoniae,
- skin and soft tissue infections caused by Staphylococcus aureus, including methicillin-resistant Staphylococcus aureus (MRSA) infections,
- anthrax caused by Bacillus anthracis infection.

==== Penicillin contraindication ====
When penicillin is contraindicated, doxycycline can be used to treat:

- syphilis caused by Treponema pallidum,
- yaws caused by Treponema pertenue,
- listeriosis due to Listeria monocytogenes,
- Vincent's infection caused by Fusobacterium fusiforme,
- actinomycosis caused by Actinomyces israelii,
- infections caused by Clostridium species.

==== Use as adjunctive therapy ====
Doxycycline is used as an adjunctive therapy for severe acne, acute intestinal amebiasis, and chancroid.

Subantimicrobial-dose doxycycline (SDD) is widely used as an adjunctive treatment to scaling and root planing for periodontitis. SDD is also used to treat skin conditions such as acne and rosacea, including ocular rosacea. In ocular rosacea, treatment period is 2 to 3 months. After discontinuation of doxycycline, recurrences may occur within three months; therefore, many studies recommend either slow tapering or treatment with a lower dose over a longer period of time.

==== As prophylaxis against sexually transmitted infections ====
Doxycycline is used as post-exposure prophylaxis (PEP) to prevent certain sexually transmitted infections, known as doxycycline post-exposure prophylaxis (doxyPEP). A landmark randomized trial in San Francisco found that a single 200 mg dose of doxycycline taken within 72 hours after condomless sex reduced the overall incidence of bacterial STIs by approximately two-thirds among men who have sex with men (MSM) and transgender women, with reductions of 87–88% for chlamydia, 73–87% for syphilis, and 55% for gonorrhea. However, a separate trial found doxyPEP was not effective in cisgender women.

In June 2024, the US Centers for Disease Control and Prevention (CDC) issued clinical guidelines recommending doxyPEP for MSM and transgender women with at least one bacterial STI in the prior 12 months. The Australasian Society for HIV Medicine issued a more cautious consensus statement recommending doxyPEP only for syphilis prevention in MSM, citing concerns that the risk of increasing antimicrobial resistance, especially in Neisseria gonorrhoeae, outweighed the benefits for other STIs. Use of doxyPEP has been associated with tetracycline resistance in N. gonorrhoeae.

==== Use in combination ====
The first-line treatment for brucellosis is a combination of doxycycline and streptomycin. The second-line treatment is a combination of doxycycline and rifampicin (rifampin).

=== Antimalarial ===
Doxycycline is active against the erythrocytic stages of Plasmodium falciparum, a protozoan parasite that causes malaria, but it is not active against the gametocytes of P. falciparum. As such, doxycycline is used to prevent malaria, but not recommended alone for initial treatment of malaria, even when the parasite is doxycycline-sensitive, because the antimalarial effect of doxycycline is delayed by 48 to 96 hours owing to a "delayed death" mechanism in which parasites complete their current replication cycle before dying in the next cycle. For this reason, doxycycline prophylaxis must be continued for four weeks after leaving a malarious area, compared with only seven days for atovaquone/proguanil.

Doxycycline blocks protein production in the apicoplast (an organelle) of P. falciparum. This disrupts the parasite's ability to produce fatty acids, which are essential for its growth, and impairs the production of heme, a cofactor. These effects occur late in the parasite's life cycle during the blood stage (the erythrocytic cycle, when the parasite replicates inside human red blood cells). By blocking important processes in the parasite, doxycycline both inhibits the growth and prevents the replication of P. falciparum. Doxycycline does not directly kill living P. falciparum, but creates conditions that prevent their growth and replication.

The World Health Organization (WHO) guidelines state that the combination of doxycycline with either artesunate or quinine may be used for the treatment of uncomplicated malaria due to P. falciparum or following intravenous treatment of severe malaria.

=== Deworming ===
Doxycycline can be used against parasitic nematodes (worms) that cause filariasis. It kills symbiotic bacteria of the genus Wolbachia in the reproductive tracts of the nematodes, making the nematodes sterile (unable to reproduce). This reduces transmission of diseases such as onchocerciasis and elephantiasis. A randomized controlled trial showed that an eight-week course of doxycycline almost eliminates the release of microfilariae (larval offspring of the nematodes).

=== Spectrum of susceptibility ===
Doxycycline has been used successfully to treat sexually transmitted, respiratory, and eye infections. Representative pathogenic genera include Chlamydia, Streptococcus, Ureaplasma, Mycoplasma, and others. The minimum inhibitory concentration for a few medically significant microorganisms are:

- Chlamydia psittaci: 0.03 μg/mL
- Mycoplasma pneumoniae: 0.016–2 μg/mL
- Streptococcus pneumoniae: 0.06–32 μg/mL

=== Sclerotherapy ===
Doxycycline is also used for sclerotherapy in venous and lymphatic malformations, as well as post-operative lymphoceles (collections of lymph fluid outside of lymphatic vessels).

==== Off-label use ====
Doxycycline is used off-label in the treatment of transthyretin amyloidosis (ATTR). In combination with tauroursodeoxycholic acid, doxycycline has been shown to disrupt transthyretin (TTR) fibrils in existing amyloid deposits of ATTR patients, and is being investigated as a potential treatment option for this condition.

=== Routes of administration ===
Doxycycline can be administered orally or intravenously.

The combination of doxycycline with dairy, antacids, calcium supplements, iron products, laxatives containing magnesium, or bile acid sequestrants may decrease absorption of doxycycline, though these interactions are not inherently dangerous.

Doxycycline has a high oral bioavailability, as it is almost completely absorbed in the stomach and proximal small intestine. Unlike older tetracyclines, whose absorption is substantially reduced by food, doxycycline absorption is only modestly affected: co-administration of dairy products reduces the serum concentration of doxycycline by about 20%, compared with a 50% reduction for tetracycline. Doxycycline absorption is inhibited by cations with a 2+ or 3+ charge (divalent and trivalent cations), such as iron, bismuth, aluminum, calcium, and magnesium. Doxycycline forms unstable complexes with these metal ions in the acidic environment of the stomach; most of these complexes dissociate in the small intestine, allowing the drug to be absorbed. However, some doxycycline remains complexed with metal ions in the duodenum, resulting in a slight decrease in absorption.

== Contraindications ==
Doxycycline is contraindicated (should not be used) in patients with severe liver disease or those taking isotretinoin or other retinoids, as both tetracyclines and retinoids can cause intracranial hypertension (increased pressure around the brain) in rare cases.

=== Pregnancy and lactation ===
Doxycycline is categorized by the FDA as a class D drug in pregnancy, meaning there is evidence of risk to the fetus but the benefits may outweigh the risks in certain situations. Doxycycline crosses into breast milk and is therefore a concern during breastfeeding. Other tetracycline antibiotics are contraindicated in pregnancy and up to eight years of age, due to the potential for disrupting bone and tooth development. The FDA includes a class warning for all tetracyclines about staining of teeth (typically yellow to brown discoloration) and decreased development of dental enamel in children exposed to tetracyclines in utero, during breastfeeding, or during early childhood (under eight years of age). However, the FDA has acknowledged that the actual risk of dental staining of primary teeth is undetermined for doxycycline specifically. The best available evidence indicates that doxycycline has little or no effect on hypoplasia (underdevelopment) of dental enamel or on staining of primary teeth (baby teeth). The US Centers for Disease Control and Prevention (CDC) recommends the use of doxycycline for treatment of Q fever and tick-borne rickettsial diseases in children of all ages, and some researchers advocate for its use in children with malaria as well.

== Adverse effects ==
Adverse effects of doxycycline are similar to those of other members of the tetracycline antibiotic group. Doxycycline can cause gastrointestinal upset. Oral doxycycline can cause pill esophagitis, particularly when it is swallowed without adequate fluid, or by persons with difficulty swallowing or reduced gastrointestinal motility. Doxycycline is less likely than other antibiotic drugs to cause Clostridioides difficile colitis.

An erythematous (red) rash in sun-exposed parts of the body has been reported to occur in 7.3–21.2% of persons taking doxycycline as prophylaxis against malaria. The rash resolves upon discontinuation of the drug. One study examined the tolerability of various malaria prophylactic regimens and found doxycycline did not cause a significantly higher percentage of skin events (such as rash, itching, or photosensitivity) when compared with other antimalarials.

Unlike some other members of the tetracycline group, doxycycline may be used in those with renal impairment, because it is primarily excreted via the feces rather than the kidneys, and does not accumulate to toxic levels when kidney function is reduced.

Doxycycline use has been associated with increased risk of inflammatory bowel disease. In one large retrospective study, patients who were prescribed doxycycline for their acne had a 2.25-fold greater risk of developing Crohn's disease.

== Interactions ==
Previously, doxycycline was believed to impair the effectiveness of many types of hormonal contraception due to induction of CYP450 enzymes (a family of liver enzymes that break down drugs, potentially accelerating the metabolism of hormonal contraceptives). Research has shown no significant loss of effectiveness in oral contraceptives while using most tetracycline antibiotics (including doxycycline), although many physicians still recommend the use of barrier contraception for people taking the drug to prevent unwanted pregnancy.

== Pharmacology ==
=== Pharmacodynamics ===
Doxycycline, like other tetracycline antibiotics, is bacteriostatic. The drug works by preventing bacteria from reproducing, inhibiting protein synthesis.

Doxycycline is highly lipophilic, so it can easily enter cells, meaning the drug is readily absorbed and has a large volume of distribution (it distributes widely throughout body tissues rather than remaining in the blood). The drug can also be re-absorbed in the renal tubules and gastrointestinal tract due to its high lipophilicity, giving it a long elimination half-life. In patients with kidney failure, doxycycline does not accumulate to toxic levels because the body compensates by increasing excretion through the feces. Doxycycline-metal ion complexes are unstable in acidic conditions, therefore more doxycycline enters the duodenum for absorption than older tetracycline compounds such as tetracycline and oxytetracycline. In addition, food has less effect on the absorption of doxycycline than on other tetracyclines, with doxycycline serum concentrations being reduced by about 20% by test meals compared with 50% for tetracycline.

==== Mechanism of action ====
Doxycycline is a broad-spectrum bacteriostatic antibiotic. It inhibits the synthesis of bacterial proteins by binding to the 30S ribosomal subunit, which is only found in bacteria. This prevents the binding of transfer RNA to messenger RNA at the ribosomal subunit, meaning amino acids cannot be added to polypeptide chains and new proteins cannot be made. This stops bacterial growth, giving the immune system time to kill the bacteria.

In rosacea treatment, doxycycline inhibits neutrophil chemotaxis and oxidative bursts (common mechanisms of inflammation and reactive oxygen species activity in rosacea), and it also suppresses matrix metalloproteases and kallikrein 5 which in turn reduce the expression of the human cathelicidin antimicrobial peptide (LL-37) and limit downstream inflammatory cascades.

=== Absorption and excretion ===
Doxycycline is almost completely absorbed from the stomach and upper part of the small intestine (duodenum and jejunum). It reaches highest concentrations in the blood plasma after one to two hours and has a high plasma protein binding rate of about 80–90%. Doxycycline penetrates into almost all tissues and body fluids. High concentrations are found in the gallbladder, liver, kidneys, lungs, breast milk, bones, and genitals; low concentrations are found in saliva, aqueous humor, cerebrospinal fluid (CSF), and especially in inflamed meninges. By comparison, the tetracycline antibiotic minocycline penetrates significantly better into the CSF and meninges.

Doxycycline metabolism (breakdown by the body) is negligible. The drug is actively excreted into the gut (in part via the gallbladder, in part directly from blood vessels), where some of it is inactivated by forming chelates. About 40% are eliminated via the kidneys, much less in people with end-stage kidney disease. The biological half-life is 18 to 22 hours (16 ± 6 hours according to another source) in healthy people, slightly longer in those with end-stage kidney disease, and significantly longer in those with liver disease.

== Chemistry ==
Expired tetracyclines or tetracyclines allowed to stand at a pH less than 2 are reported to be nephrotoxic due to the formation of a degradation product, anhydro-4-epitetracycline causing Fanconi syndrome. In the case of doxycycline, the absence of a hydroxyl group in C-6 prevents the formation of the nephrotoxic compound. Nevertheless, tetracyclines and doxycycline itself have to be taken with caution in patients with kidney injury, as they can worsen azotemia due to catabolic effects.

=== Chemical properties ===
Doxycycline, doxycycline monohydrate and doxycycline hyclate are yellow, crystalline powders with a bitter taste. The latter smells faintly of ethanol, a 1% aqueous solution has a pH of 2–3, and the specific rotation is $[\alpha]_D^{25}$ −110° cm^{3}/dm·g in 0.01 N methanolic hydrochloric acid.

Solubility
Solubility in	Doxycycline	Doxycycline monohydrate	Doxycycline hyclate
Water	very slightly	very slightly	freely
Ethanol	very slightly	very slightly	sparingly
Aqueous acids	freely	freely	
Alkali hydroxyde solutions	freely	freely	
Chloroform	very slightly	practically insoluble	practically insoluble
Diethyl ether	insoluble	practically insoluble	practically insoluble

== History ==
After penicillin came into wide use for bacterial infections in World War II, many chemical companies moved into the field of discovering antibiotics by bioprospecting. American Cyanamid was one of these, and in the late 1940s chemists there discovered chlortetracycline, the first member of the tetracycline class of antibiotics. Shortly thereafter, scientists at Pfizer discovered oxytetracycline and it was brought to market. Both compounds, like penicillin, were natural products and it was commonly believed that nature had perfected them, and further chemical changes could only degrade their effectiveness. Scientists at Pfizer led by Lloyd Conover modified these compounds, which led to the invention of tetracycline itself, the first semi-synthetic antibiotic. Charlie Stephens' group at Pfizer worked on further analogs and created one with greatly improved stability and pharmacological efficacy: doxycycline. Doxycycline was clinically developed in the early 1960s and approved by the US Food and Drug Administration (FDA) in 1967.

As its patent grew near to expiring in the early 1970s, the patent became the subject of lawsuit between Pfizer and International Rectifier that was not resolved until 1983; at the time it was the largest litigated patent case in US history. Instead of a cash payment for infringement, Pfizer took the veterinary and feed-additive businesses of International Rectifier's subsidiary, Rachelle Laboratories.

In January 2013, the FDA reported shortages of some, but not all, forms of doxycycline "caused by increased demand and manufacturing issues". Companies involved included an unnamed major generics manufacturer that ceased production in February 2013, Teva (which ceased production in May 2013), Mylan, Actavis, and Hikma Pharmaceuticals. The shortage came at a particularly bad time, since there were also shortages of an alternative antibiotic, tetracycline, at the same time. The market price for doxycycline dramatically increased in the United States in 2013 and early 2014 (from $20 to over $1800 for a bottle of 500 tablets), before decreasing again.

== Society and culture ==
=== Brand names ===
Doxycycline is available worldwide under many brand names.

=== Generic availability ===
Doxycycline is available as a generic medicine.

== Research ==
=== Research reagent ===
Doxycycline-activated Tet-ON (tetracycline-controlled transcriptional activation) system driving inducible short hairpin RNA (shRNA) expression for controlled gene silencing via the RNA interference pathway. The Tet-ON inducible shRNA system is a regulated gene-silencing platform where short hairpin RNA (shRNA) expression is switched on only in the presence of a tetracycline-class antibiotic, such as doxycycline. Doxycycline binds to a modified Tet repressor (TetR) protein, enabling it to activate transcription from a Tet-responsive promoter, producing shRNA that is processed into small interfering RNA (siRNA) by the cell's RNA interference (RNAi) machinery. This system allows researchers to precisely control the timing and level of target gene knockdown, minimizing off-target effects and enabling studies of essential genes without permanent silencing.

Doxycycline and other members of the tetracycline class of antibiotics are often used as research reagents in in vitro and in vivo biomedical research experiments involving bacteria as well in experiments in eukaryotic cells and organisms with inducible protein expression systems using tetracycline-controlled transcriptional activation. The mechanism of action for the antibacterial effect of tetracyclines relies on disrupting protein translation in bacteria, thereby damaging the ability of microbes to grow and repair; however protein translation is also disrupted in eukaryotic mitochondria impairing metabolism and leading to effects that can confound experimental results. Doxycycline is also used in "tet-on" (gene expression activated by doxycycline) and "tet-off" (gene expression inactivated by doxycycline) tetracycline-controlled transcriptional activation to regulate transgene expression in organisms and cell cultures. Doxycycline is more stable than tetracycline for this purpose. At subantimicrobial doses, doxycycline is an inhibitor of matrix metalloproteases, and has been used in various experimental systems for this purpose, such as for recalcitrant recurrent corneal erosions.

=== Medical conditions ===
Research areas on the application of doxycycline include the following medical conditions:

- macular degeneration;
- rheumatoid arthritis instead of minocycline (both of which have demonstrated modest efficacy for this disease).

=== Dosing ===
Although doxycycline is approved to treat Lyme disease, the optimal dosing and duration of treatment for this condition is a topic of ongoing research. it can be used in adults and children. For treatment or prophylaxis of Lyme disease in children, it can be used for a duration of up to 21 days in children of any age. Doxycycline is specifically indicated to treat Lyme disease for patients presenting with erythema migrans. As for the optimal duration of treatment of this disease, guidelines vary, with some recommending a 10-day course of doxycycline, while others suggest a 14-day course; still, recent data suggest that even a 7-day course of doxycycline can be effective. Compared to other drugs, there are no significant differences in treatment response across antibiotic agents, doses, or durations when comparing 14 days versus 21 days; as such, the optimal duration of treatment of Lyme disease remains uncertain, as prolonged antibiotic courses have drawbacks, including diminishing returns in terms of patient outcomes, heightened risks of adverse events, superinfections, increased healthcare costs, and the potential for development of antibiotic resistance. Therefore, the consensus remains to treat patients with the shortest effective duration of antibiotics, as is the case with doxycycline for Lyme disease as well.

=== Anti-inflammatory agent ===
Some studies show doxycycline as a potential agent to possess anti-inflammatory properties acting by inhibiting proinflammatory cytokines such as interleukin-1 (IL-1), interleukin-6 (IL-6), tumor necrosis factor-alpha (TNF-α), and matrix metalloproteinases (MMPs) while increasing the production of anti-inflammatory cytokines such as interleukin-10 (IL-10). Cytokines are small proteins that are secreted by immune cells and help regulate the immune response. Some studies suggest that doxycycline can suppress the activation of the nuclear factor-kappa B (NF-κB) pathway, which is responsible for upregulating several inflammatory mediators in various cells, including neurons; therefore, it is studied as a potential agent for treating neuroinflammation.

A potential explanation of doxycycline's anti-inflammatory properties is its inhibition of matrix metalloproteinases (MMPs), which are a group of proteases known to regulate the turnover of extracellular matrix (ECM) and thus are suggested to be important in the process of several diseases associated with tissue remodeling and inflammation. Doxycycline has been shown to inhibit MMPs, including matrilysin (MMP7), by interacting with the structural zinc atom and/or calcium atoms within the structural metal center of the protein.

Doxycycline also inhibits allikrein-related peptidase 5 (KLK5). The inhibition of MMPs and KLK5 enzymes subsequently suppresses the expression of LL-37, a cathelicidin antimicrobial peptide that, when overexpressed, can trigger inflammatory cascades. By inhibiting LL-37 expression, doxycycline helps to mitigate these downstream inflammatory cascades, thereby reducing inflammation and the symptoms of inflammatory conditions.

Doxycycline is used to treat acne vulgaris and rosacea. However, there is no clear understanding of what contributes more: the bacteriostatic properties of doxycycline, which affect bacteria (such as Propionibacterium acnes) on the surface of sebaceous glands even in lower doses called "submicrobial" or "subantimicrobial", or whether doxycycline's anti-inflammatory effects, which reduce inflammation in acne vulgaris and rosacea, including ocular rosacea, contribute more to its therapeutic effectiveness against these skin conditions. Subantimicrobial-dose doxycycline (SDD) can still have a bacteriostatic effect, especially when taken for extended periods, such as several months in treating acne and rosacea. While the SDD is believed to have anti-inflammatory effects rather than solely antibacterial effects, SDD was proven to work by reducing inflammation associated with acne and rosacea. Still, the exact mechanisms have yet to be fully discovered. One probable mechanism is doxycycline's ability to decrease the amount of reactive oxygen species (ROS). Inflammation in rosacea may be associated with increased production of ROS by inflammatory cells; these ROS contribute toward exacerbating symptoms. Doxycycline may reduce ROS levels and induce antioxidant activity because it directly scavenges hydroxyl radicals and singlet oxygen, helping minimize tissue damage caused by highly oxidative and inflammatory conditions. Studies have shown that SDD can effectively improve acne and rosacea symptoms, probably without inducing antibiotic resistance. It is observed that doxycycline exerts its anti-inflammatory effects by inhibiting neutrophil chemotaxis and oxidative bursts, which are common mechanisms involved in inflammation and ROS activity in rosacea and acne.

Doxycycline's dual benefits as an antibacterial and anti-inflammatory make it a helpful treatment option for diseases involving inflammation of the skin, such as rosacea and acne, and in conditions such as osteoarthritis or periodontitis. Nevertheless, current results are inconclusive, and evidence of doxycycline's anti-inflammatory properties needs to be improved, considering conflicting reports from animal models so far. Doxycycline has been studied in various immunological disorders, including rheumatoid arthritis, lupus, and periodontitis. In these conditions, doxycycline has been researched to determine anti-inflammatory and immunomodulatory effects that could be beneficial in treating these conditions. However, a solid conclusion still needs to be provided.

Doxycycline is also studied for its neuroprotective properties which are associated with antioxidant, anti-apoptotic, and anti-inflammatory mechanisms. In this context, doxycycline is able to cross the blood–brain barrier. Several studies have shown that doxycycline inhibits dopaminergic neurodegeneration through the upregulation of axonal and synaptic proteins. Axonal degeneration and synaptic loss are key events at the early stages of neurodegeneration and precede neuronal death in neurodegenerative diseases, including Parkinson's disease (PD). Therefore, the regeneration of the axonal and synaptic network might be beneficial in PD. It has been demonstrated that doxycycline mimics nerve growth factor (NGF) signaling in PC12 cells. However, the involvement of this mechanism in the neuroprotective effect of doxycycline is unknown. Doxycycline is also studied in reverting inflammatory changes related to depression. While there is some research on the use of doxycycline for treating major depressive disorder, the results are mixed.

After a large-scale trial showed no benefit of using doxycycline in treating COVID‑19, the UK's National Institute for Health and Care Excellence (NICE) updated its guidance to not recommend the medication for the treatment of COVID‑19. Doxycycline was expected to possess anti-inflammatory properties that could lessen the cytokine storm associated with a SARS-CoV-2 infection, but the trials did not demonstrate the expected benefit. Researchers also believed that doxycycline possesses anti-inflammatory and immunomodulatory effects that could reduce the production of cytokines in COVID-19, but these supposed effects failed to improve the outcome of COVID-19 treatment.

=== Wound healing ===
Research on novel drug formulations for the delivery of doxycycline in wound treatment is expanding, focusing on overcoming stability limitations for long-term storage and developing consumer-friendly, parenteral antibiotic delivery systems. The most common and practical form of doxycycline delivery is through wound dressings, which have evolved from mono- to three-layered systems to maximize healing effectiveness.

Research directions on the use of doxycycline in wound healing include the continuous stabilization of doxycycline, scaling up technology and industrial production, and exploring non-contact wound treatment methods like sprays and aerosols for use in emergencies and when medical care is not readily accessible.
