= Pomade acne =

Skin condition caused by hair styling products

Pomade acne is a type of acne cosmetica that appears as a group of small bumps close to the hairline on the forehead, frequently seen in black skin.

== Signs and symptoms ==
Pomade acne typically presents with small reddish bumps in pale skin and may look purple-brown in darker skin. Less commonly, it may be seen on the chin and cheeks. It may lead to post-inflammatory hyperpigmentation.

== Cause ==
The condition occurs when some of the pomade that is applied to the scalp drips down over the forehead.

== Treatment ==
Treatment is by discontinuation of occlusive hair pomades, headwear and oils. Other options include applying retinoids or antibiotics.

== Epidemiology ==
In the US, pomade acne develops in up to 25% of dark skinned adult males.

== See also ==
- List of cutaneous conditions
