= Steroid folliculitis =

Steroid folliculitis occurs following administration of glucocorticoids or corticotropin. Other medications can also mimic these in order to cause a similar presentation.

== See also ==
- List of cutaneous conditions
- Steroid acne
