= Ocular rosacea =

Manifestation of rosacea affecting the eyes and eyelids

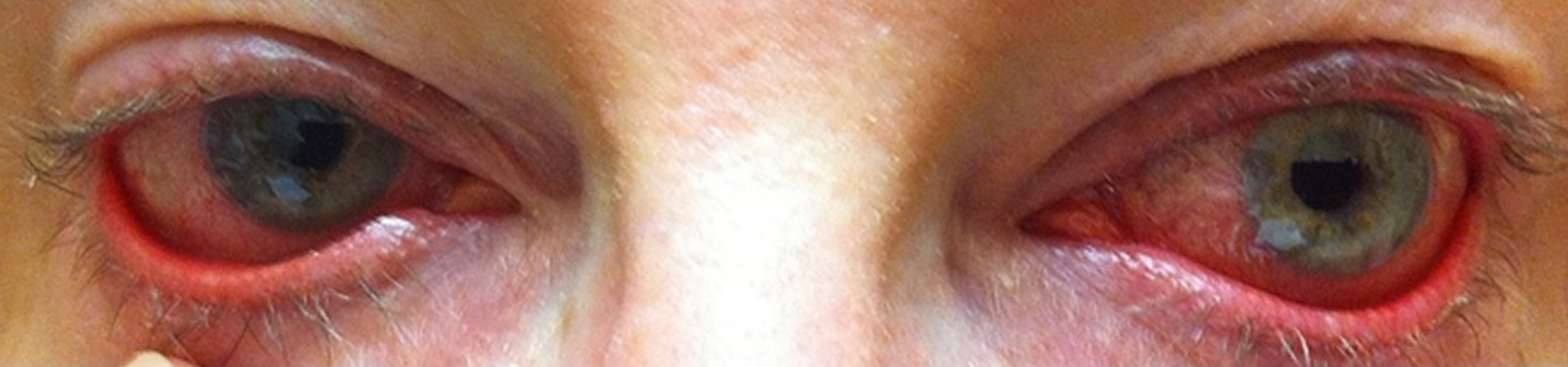
- Person with ocular rosacea
- Specialty: Ophthalmology

Ocular rosacea is a type of rosacea that affects the eyes. Signs and symptoms generally consist of redness, irritation or burning of the eyes. Affected individuals may also feel that there is something, such as an eyelash, in the eye and frequently have redness of the nose and cheeks as well. Complications include corneal ulcer.

Those who have ocular rosacea may be treated with warm compresses, artificial tears and washing the area around the eye with warm water, including the eyelids, to help relieve symptoms. Additionally, oral antibiotics, typically doxycycline, may be prescribed. Some people with ocular rosacea feel that dietary restrictions of caffeine, spicy foods, and alcoholic beverages may reduce or eliminate symptoms.

== Cause ==
Ocular rosacea may be caused by an overproliferation of the Demodex mites D. folliculorum and D. brevis, both frequently referred to as "eyelash mites".

== Treatment ==
Doxycycline can be used in the treatment of ocular rosacea in dosages of 100 mg once or twice a day for a period of 2 to 3 months. Other studies report a good efficacy of 50 mg once a day in less severe cases. A formulation of 40 mg with a delayed release for long-term therapy can also be used. Side effects of treating ocular rosacea with doxycycline include nausea, vomiting, photosensitivity and headache, which may lead to premature discontinuation of treatment. After discontinuation of doxycycline, recurrences may occur within three months; therefore, many studies recommend either slow tapering or treatment with a lower dose over a longer period of time. Low-dose doxycycline (50 mg pe day or less) improves the clinical symptoms of rosacea by its anti-inflammatory effect rather than by its antibiotic effect.
