= Oil acne =

- Specialty: Dermatology

Oil acne is an occupational skin condition caused by exposure to oils used in industry.

== See also ==
- Acne cosmetica
- List of cutaneous conditions
- Soot tattoo
