= Tar acne =

- Specialty: Dermatology

Tar acne is an occupational skin condition caused by exposure to tars used in industry.

== See also ==
- Soot tattoo
- List of cutaneous conditions
