= Tetracycline-controlled transcriptional activation =

Method of inducible gene expression

Example of a T-REx system controlling the expression of shRNA

Tetracycline-controlled transcriptional activation is a method of inducible gene expression where transcription is reversibly turned on or off in the presence of the antibiotic tetracycline or one of its derivatives (e.g. doxycycline).

Tetracycline-controlled gene expression is based upon the mechanism of resistance to tetracycline antibiotic treatment found in gram-negative bacteria. In nature, the P_{tet} promoter expresses TetR (the repressor) and TetA, the protein that pumps tetracycline antibiotic out of the cell.

The difference between Tet-On and Tet-Off is not whether the transactivator turns a gene on or off, as the name might suggest; rather, both proteins activate expression. The difference relates to their respective response to tetracycline or doxycycline (Dox, a more stable tetracycline analogue); Tet-Off activates expression in the absence of Dox, whereas Tet-On activates in the presence of Dox.

== Tet-Off and Tet-On ==
The two most commonly used inducible expression systems for research of eukaryote cell biology are named Tet-Off and Tet-On. The Tet-Off system for controlling expression of genes of interest in mammalian cells was developed by Professors Hermann Bujard and Manfred Gossen at the University of Heidelberg and first published in 1992.

The Tet-Off system makes use of the tetracycline transactivator (tTA) protein, which is created by fusing one protein, TetR (tetracycline repressor), found in Escherichia coli bacteria, with the activation domain of another protein, VP16, found in the herpes simplex virus.

The resulting tTA protein is able to bind to DNA at specific TetO operator sequences. In most Tet-Off systems, several repeats of such TetO sequences are placed upstream of a minimal promoter such as the CMV promoter. The entirety of several TetO sequences with a minimal promoter is called a tetracycline response element (TRE), because it responds to binding of the tetracycline transactivator protein tTA by increased expression of the gene or genes downstream of its promoter.

In a Tet-Off system, expression of TRE-controlled genes can be repressed by tetracycline and its derivatives. They bind tTA and render it incapable of binding to TRE sequences, thereby preventing transactivation of TRE-controlled genes.

A Tet-On system works similarly, but in the opposite fashion. While in a Tet-Off system, tTA is capable of binding the operator only if not bound to tetracycline or one of its derivatives, such as doxycycline, in a Tet-On system, the rtTA protein is capable of binding the operator only if bound by a tetracycline. Thus the introduction of doxycycline to the system initiates the transcription of the genetic product. The Tet-On system is sometimes preferred over Tet-Off for its faster responsiveness.

Tet-Off expression systems are also used in generating transgenic mice which conditionally express gene of interest.

== Tet-On Advanced and Tet-On 3G ==
The Tet-On Advanced transactivator (also known as rtTA2^{S}-M2) is an alternative version of Tet-On that shows reduced basal expression, and functions at a 10-fold lower Dox concentration than Tet-Off. In addition, its expression is considered to be more stable in eukaryotic cells due to being human codon optimized and utilizing three minimal transcriptional activation domains. It was discovered in 2000 as one of two improved mutants by H. Bujard and his colleagues after random mutagenesis of the Tet repressor part of the transactivator gene. Tet-On 3G (also known as rtTA-V10) is similar to Tet-On Advanced but was derived from rtTA2^{S}-S2 rather than rtTA2^{S}-M2. It is also human codon optimized and composed of three minimal VP16 activation domains. However, the Tet-On 3G protein has five amino acid differences compared to Tet-On Advanced which appear to increase its sensitivity to Dox even further. Tet-On 3G is sensitive to 100-fold less Dox and is seven-fold more active than the original Tet-On.

== Other systems ==
Other systems such as the T-REx system by Life Technologies work in a different fashion. The gene of interest is flanked by an upstream CMV promoter and two TetO2 sites. Expression of the gene of interest is repressed by the high affinity binding of TetR homodimers to each TetO2 sequences in the absence of tetracycline. Introduction of tetracycline results in binding of one tetracycline on each TetR homodimer followed by release of TetO2 by the TetR homodimers. Unbinding of TetR homodimers and TetO2 result in derepression of the gene of interest.

A modified version of T-REx is the Linearizer synthetic biological circuit, optimized for gene expression tuning in eukaryotic (budding yeast, human, etc) cells. By incorporating TetO2 sites into the promoter driving TetR expression, it creates negative feedback, which ensures homogeneous expression (low noise) and a linear dose-response to tetracycline analogs.

== Tetracycline response element (TRE) ==
In the most commonly used plasmids, the tetracycline response element consists of seven repeats of the 19bp bacterial TetO sequence ( TCCCTATCAGTGATAGAGA ) separated by spacer sequences (for example: ACGATGTCGAGTTTAC). It is the TetO that is recognized and bound by the TetR portion of Tet-On or Tet-Off. The TRE is usually placed upstream of a minimal promoter that has very low basal expression in the absence of bound Tet-Off (or Tet-On).

== Advantages and disadvantages ==
The Tet system has advantages over Cre, FRT, and ER (estrogen receptor) conditional gene expression systems. In the Cre and FRT systems, activation or knockout of the gene is irreversible once recombination is accomplished, whereas, in Tet and ER systems, it is reversible. The Tet system has very tight control on expression, whereas ER system is somewhat leaky. However, the Tet system, which depends on transcription and subsequent translation of a target gene, is not as fast-acting as the ER system, which stabilizes the already-expressed target protein upon hormone administration. Also, since the 19bp tet-o sequence is naturally absent from mammalian cells, pleiotropy is thought to be minimized compared to hormonal methods of control. When using the Tet system in cell culture, it is important to confirm that each batch of fetal bovine serum is tested to confirm that contaminating tetracyclines are absent or are too low to interfere with inducibility.

The mechanism of action for the antibacterial effect of tetracyclines relies on disrupting protein translation in bacteria, thereby damaging the ability of microbes to grow and repair; however protein translation is also disrupted in eukaryotic mitochondria leading to effects that may confound experimental results.

== See also ==
- Mouse models of breast cancer metastasis
- Gene trapping
- Tamoxifen-induced gene expression
