= TetR =

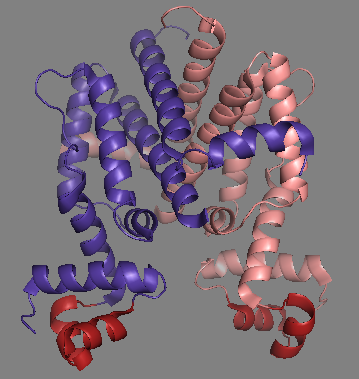
TetR as a homodimer: Each monomer is shown in purple or salmon. The helix-turn-helix motif is shown in deep red.

Tet repressor proteins (otherwise known as TetR) are proteins playing an important role in conferring antibiotic resistance to large categories of bacterial species.

Tetracycline (Tc) is a broad family of antibiotics to which bacteria have evolved resistance. Tc normally kills bacteria by binding to the bacterial ribosome and halting protein synthesis. The expression of Tc resistance genes is regulated by the repressor TetR. TetR represses the expression of TetA, a membrane protein that pumps out substances toxic to the bacteria like Tc, by binding the tetA operator. In Tc-resistant bacteria, TetA will pump out Tc before it can bind to the ribosome because the repressive action of TetR on TetA is halted by binding of Tc to TetR. Therefore, TetR may have an important role in helping scientists to better understand mechanisms of antibiotic resistance and how to treat antibiotic-resistant bacteria. TetR is one of many proteins in the TetR protein family, which is so named because TetR is the most well characterized member.

TetR is used in artificially engineered gene regulatory networks because of its capacity for fine regulation of promoters. In the absence of Tc or analogs like ATc, basal expression of TetR-regulated promoters is low, but expression rises sharply in the presence of even a minute quantity of Tc. The tetA gene is also present in the widely used E. coli cloning vector pBR322, where it is often referred to by the name of its tetracycline-resistance phenotype, Tet^{R}, not to be confused with TetR.

== Structure and function ==
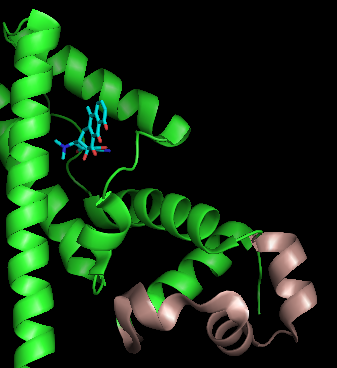
Tetracycline-magnesium complex (blue) bound to cavity of TetR (green). HTH motif shown in pink – note conformational change.

TetR functions as a homodimer. Each monomer consists of ten alpha helices connected by loops and turns. The overall structure of TetR can be broken down into two DNA-binding domains (one per monomer) and a regulatory core, which is responsible for tetracycline recognition and dimerization. TetR dimerizes by making hydrophobic contacts within the regulatory core. There is a binding cavity for tetracycline in the outer helices of the regulatory domain. When tetracycline binds this cavity, it causes a conformational change that affects the DNA-binding domain so that TetR is no longer able to bind DNA. As a result, TetA and TetR are expressed. There is still some debate in the field whether tetracycline derivatives alone can cause this conformational change or whether tetracycline must be in complex with magnesium to bind TetR. (TetR typically binds tetracycline-Mg^{2+} complexes inside bacteria, but TetR binding to tetracycline alone has been observed in vitro.)

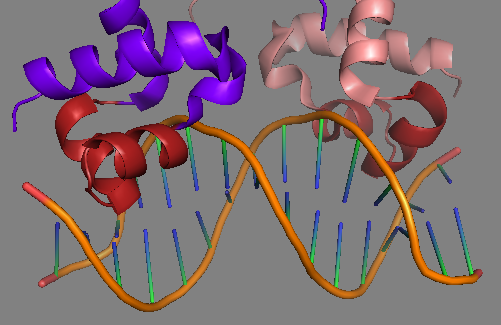
TetR (purple and salmon) in complex with its target DNA sequence. HTH motifs are shown in red binding to the major grooves of the DNA. PDB: 1QPI

The DNA-binding domains of TetR recognize a 15-base-pair palindromic sequence of the TetA operator. These domains mainly consist of a helix-turn-helix (HTH) motif that is common in TetR protein family members (see below). However, the N-terminal residues preceding this motif have also been shown to be important for DNA binding. Although these residues do not directly contact the DNA, they pack against the HTH and this packing is essential for binding. The HTH motifs have mostly hydrophobic interactions with major grooves of the target DNA. Binding of TetR to its target DNA sequence causes changes in both the DNA and TetR. TetR causes widening of the major grooves as well as kinking of the DNA; one helix of the HTH motif of TetR adopts a 3_{10} helical turn as the result of complex DNA interactions.

== TetR protein family ==
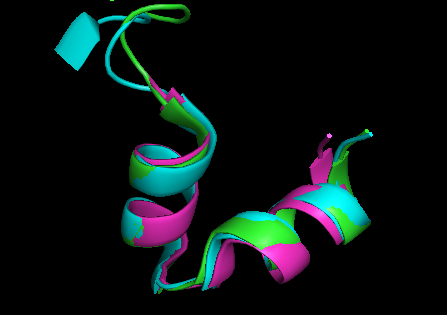
HTH motif alignment of three TetR family members: MtrR (magenta), SimR (cyan), & AmtR (green)

As of June 2005, this family of proteins had about 2,353 members that are transcriptional regulators. (Transcriptional regulators control gene expression.) These proteins contain a helix-turn-helix (HTH) motif that is the DNA-binding domain. The second helix is considered to be most important for DNA sequence specificity and often recognizes nucleic acids within the major groove of the double helix. In the majority of the family members, this motif is on the N-terminal end of the protein and is highly conserved. The high conservation of the HTH motif is not observed for the other domains of the protein. The differences observed in these other regulatory domains are likely due to differences in the molecules that each family member senses.

TetR protein family members are mostly transcriptional repressors, meaning that they prevent the expression of certain genes at the DNA level. These proteins can act on genes with various functions including antibiotic resistance, biosynthesis and metabolism, bacterial pathogenesis, and response to cell stress.

== See also ==
- Tetracycline controlled transcriptional activation
