= Acne mechanica =

Skin condition

- Specialty: Dermatology

Acne mechanica is an acneiform eruption that has been observed after repetitive physical trauma to the skin such as rubbing, occurring from clothing (belts and straps) or sports equipment (football helmets and shoulder pads). In addition to those mechanisms, the skin not getting enough exposure to air also contributes to the formation of acne mechanica. It is often mistaken as a rash that forms on sweaty skin that is constantly being rubbed, but in reality, it is a breakout of acne mechanica. The term "acne" itself describes the occurrence in which hair follicles (also known as pores) in the skin get clogged by oil, dead skin cells, dirt and bacteria, or cosmetic products and create a pimple. Pimples can vary in type, size, and shape, but the sole basis of them occurring is the same - the oil gland in the pore becomes clogged and sometimes infected, which creates pus in order to fight the infection and subsequently causes the development of swollen, red lesions on the skin.

== Signs and symptoms ==
The signs and symptoms at an early stage are harder to be seen. Initially, acne mechanica resembles any other type of acne. However, it has a different cause. Much acne has to do with hormones, the amount of oil production in the skin, and genetic predispositions. Acne mechanica specifically refers to the skin irritation that is formed by excess pressure, heat, and rubbing against the skin.

When the skin is constantly rubbed, it initially becomes rough and then starts to develop acne-like bumps with continuing irritation like sweating or more friction. If the skin continues to be irritated for a longer period of time, a more serious acne lesion develops that grows in size and redness. They appear as small, red tender bumps called papules. There may be a combination of whiteheads and blackheads that also appear around the area affected, the difference being that whiteheads are closed and clogged pores whereas blackheads are also clogged but open pores. The symptoms may vary also depending on a person's skin type; overly oily or dry skin can cause a number of symptoms that heighten the possibility for acne mechanica to develop.

== Cause ==
Repetitive rubbing of the skin, in instances such as backpack strings rubbing on your shoulders or helmet straps rubbing on your chin are actions that can irritate the skin and cause acne mechanica.

Acne mechanica is a specific type of acne that is caused by friction, heat, and/or pressure on the skin. Especially occurs when the skin is not exposed to air. It is commonly found in athletes because sweaty, constantly rubbed skin by a tight uniform, for example, can result in a rash. What may look like a rash is actually acne mechanica. Another common area for acne mechanica to show up is on the sides of your face where you hold your cell phone, especially with the added bacteria it carries on it.

There are some people who are more prone to develop acne mechanica. The biggest group of people affected by this type of acne are teenagers and young adults in their twenties who already experience issues with acne on their back, shoulders, and buttocks.

Other people who have a type of acne commonly described as "sandpaper acne," which is characterized as small but rough acne lesions that are not very visible but feel like sandpaper to the touch, also are more prone to developing acne mechanica.

== Mechanism ==
Acne mechanica specifically is triggered by both mechanical and heat stress on the skin working together to cause this irritation. The skin that is exposed to these stressors initially develops a harder surface to protect itself, but if the skin is continually dealing with this pressure, it gets irritated and forms a rash. At this point, it gets qualified as acne mechanica.

When you are in a hot climate or are working out and your body temperature rises, the heat causes the pores in your skin to open up. The dilation of the pores makes it easier for bacteria, oil, and dead skin cells to collect in the pores and clog them. Every pore in your body has a tiny hair follicle, and the blockage causes the hair follicle to become irritated and inflamed, which ends up forming pimples; specifically acne mechanica. White blood cells flood the area of inflammation, and once they die, they accumulate on the surface of the pore, causing what is known as a "whitehead". When people pop pimples, pus comes out, which has the dead white blood cells in it that originally came to diffuse the inflammation.

Depending on the continuation of the stressors, the inflammatory pimples (also known as papules and pustules) can develop into nodules and cysts, which are more severe forms of acne that are rooted deeper within the skin.

== Diagnosis ==
Acne mechanica can be diagnosed by a dermatologist via a physical examination. In more extreme cases, a skin biopsy is performed to examine the pathology.

Family and medical history are also looked at to see if the patient has a hereditary tendency to certain conditions that cause different types of acne, which may play a role in acne mechanica development. For example, if a patient's parents had acne, there is a very strong probability they will also have similar issues. The issues can range from things like overproducing dead skin cells or the pores having a higher tendency to clog.

== Treatment ==
Acne mechanica has no direct cure, however, there are preventive measures that can be taken to minimize its breakouts. The most obvious solution to prevent extra rubbing or heat entrapment on the surface of the skin is to wear either loose-fitting clothes or wearing clothes made out of more breathable fabrics, especially during exercising, playing sports, or when performing physical activities such as hiking. Loose clothes will not rub as much and create the mechanical stress on the skin. Instead of wearing clothes made out of polyester and rayon, choosing cotton materials will help relieve the heat stress on the skin and not trap sweat in the pores. Taking showers immediately after any form of physical exercise will also help keep the skin as clean as possible. Keeping up with a skin care regimen so the skin is moisturized helps as well. Using skin care products specifically with salicylic acid or benzoyl peroxide help exfoliate the skin in a gentle manner and get rid of bacteria. Both of these chemicals in a facial cleanser may create a tingling sensation on people with extremely sensitive skin. Other topical ointments can be used once consulted with a dermatologist.

== Prognosis ==
Long term effects of acne mechanica include potential scarring and skin discoloration at the area of the acne lesion if rubbing of the skin continues. It is not a lethal condition and the acne will clear up on its own once the heat and pressure stressors are avoided and if the skin is kept clean so the pores do not continue to become clogged.

== Epidemiology ==
Acne mechanica is most prevalent among athletes, soldiers in warm climates, teenagers and young adults. The athletes and soldiers can get rashes from their equipment and uniforms constantly rubbing their skin while sweating, which turn into acne mechanica lesions. Men tend to be more prone to develop acne mechanica because they produce more oil (also known as sebum) in their glands, even though their glands are actually smaller than women's. This is also a reason why men's acne tends to remain a problem for longer once its developed. Acne in general is hereditary from parents to child, so genetics play a factor as well. People who already have acne and have a problematic skin type that tends to create clogged pores are more likely to develop acne mechanica as well.

== Research directions ==
Although not exactly having to do with acne mechanica and the heat or pressure stressors that cause it, there is still little research relating to different organ's health relating to acne appearing on different areas of the body and face. A correlation between the two could be explored in future studies.

== See also ==
- List of cutaneous conditions
