= Tropical acne =

- Specialty: Dermatology

Tropical acne is unusually severe acne occurring in the tropics during seasons when the weather is hot and humid.

Skin conditions including acne are seen with more frequency in dermatological consultations in hot and humid climates, where bacterial and fungal infections are more common, than in drier climates.

== See also ==
- List of cutaneous conditions
- List of skin conditions
- Oil acne
- Skin condition
