= Acne cosmetica =

- Specialty: Dermatology
- Symptoms: Dense group of similar sized blackheads and whiteheads, scattered small bumps in skin

Acne cosmetica is a type of contact acneiform eruption caused by or aggravated by cosmetics. Signs and symptoms include a dense group of similar sized closed comedones and scattered small bumps, typically over the skin where the cosmetic has been applied. Flare-ups do not generally occur shortly before menstruation and open comedones are not common. There may be associated perioral dermatitis.

Treatment includes withdrawing the acnegenic products, and sometimes applying a retinoid.

== Signs and symptoms ==
Signs and symptoms include a dense group of similar sized closed comedones and scattered small bumps, typically over the skin where the cosmetic has been applied. Flare-ups are not a typical feature shortly before menstruation. There may be associated perioral dermatitis.

== Cause and mechanism ==
The mechanism is thought to be chemically induced plugging of the pilosebaceous orifice. This became a significant problem for dermatologists in the 1970s and 1980s, but with the improved formulations produced by cosmetic chemists in the decades since, a diagnosis of acne cosmetica has become relatively rare in dermatological practice.

The terms "non-comedogenic" and "non-acne(i)genic" appeared on moisturizers and other cosmetic compounds as manufacturers introduced re-formulations—sometimes associated with claims that the products were "oil-free" or "water-based". Although early work produced lists of comedogenic chemicals in various strengths and vehicles, it became apparent that one could not predict the actual comedogenicity of a product from its contents; rather, the finished product itself needed use-testing.

The production of a low-grade folliculitis by some components of cosmetic products has led to misdiagnosis on occasion. People may not attribute skin reactions to their cosmetics at first, but may notice worsening symptoms after using certain face makeup, sunblock or lip products.

Reactions are more likely to occur if applied cosmetics are left on and not stripped after wearing them.

== See also ==
- List of cutaneous conditions
