= Steroid acne =

- Specialty: Dermatology

Steroid acne is an adverse reaction to corticosteroids, and presents as small, firm follicular papules on the forehead, cheeks, and chest. Steroid acne presents with monomorphous pink paupules, as well as comedones, which may be indistinguishable from those of acne vulgaris. Steroid acne is commonly associated with endogenous or exogenous sources of androgen, drug therapy, or diabetes and is less commonly associated with HIV infection or Hodgkin's disease.

== See also ==
- List of cutaneous conditions
- Steroid folliculitis
