= Cathelicidin antimicrobial peptide =

Group of antimicrobial peptides in vertebrates

CAMP

Identifiers
- Aliases: HGNC:11998 CAMP, IPR001894, CAP-18, CAP18, CRAMP, HSD26, gene FALL39, gene LL37, FALL39, LL37, FALL-39, cathelicidin antimicrobial peptide, Cathelicidins
- External IDs: OMIM: 600474; MGI: 108443; GeneCards: CAMP
Available structures
PDB	Ortholog search: PDBe RCSB
PDB	List of PDB id codes 4EYC, 2FBS, 2FBU, 2FCG, 2K6O

Gene location (Human)
Chr.	Chromosome 3 (human)
Band	3p21.31	Start	48,223,347 bp
Band	3p21.31	End	48,225,491 bp

Gene location (Mouse)
Chr.	Chromosome 9 (mouse)
Band	9 F2|9 59.8 cM	Start	109,676,447 bp
Band	9 F2|9 59.8 cM	End	109,678,685 bp
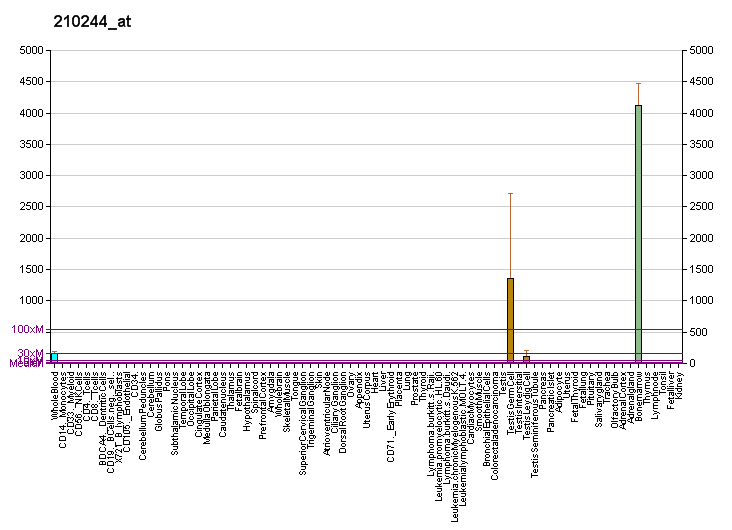
RNA expression pattern
Bgee	Human / Mouse (ortholog); Top expressed in: trabecular bone; bone marrow; bone marrow cell; tail of epididymis; corpus epididymis; blood; granulocyte; testicle; monocyte; gonad / Top expressed in: granulocyte; tibiofemoral joint; femur; body of femur; fetal liver hematopoietic progenitor cell; ankle joint; vestibular membrane of cochlear duct; spleen; bone marrow; lumbar spinal ganglion; More reference expression data
BioGPS	More reference expression data
Gene ontology
Molecular function	lipopolysaccharide binding; protein binding
Cellular component	extracellular region; specific granule; extracellular exosome; extracellular space; intracellular anatomical structure; specific granule lumen; tertiary granule lumen
Biological process	defense response; innate immune response in mucosa; innate immune response; killing by host of symbiont cells; chronic inflammatory response; defense response to bacterium; antimicrobial humoral response; antimicrobial humoral immune response mediated by antimicrobial peptide; cytolysis by host of symbiont cells; defense response to Gram-negative bacterium; defense response to Gram-positive bacterium; neutrophil degranulation
Sources:Amigo / QuickGO
Orthologs
Databases	NCBI: entry; OMA: entry
Species	Human	Mouse
Entrez	820	12796
Ensembl	ENSG00000164047	ENSMUSG00000038357
UniProt	P49913	P51437
RefSeq (mRNA)	NM_004345	NM_009921
RefSeq (protein)	NP_004336	NP_034051
Location (UCSC)	Chr 3: 48.22 – 48.23 Mb	Chr 9: 109.68 – 109.68 Mb
PubMed search
- Wikidata
View/Edit Human	View/Edit Mouse

Cathelicidin antimicrobial peptide (CAMP) is an antimicrobial peptide encoded in the human by the CAMP gene. The active form is LL-37, a 37 amino acid peptide having sequence LLGDFFRKSKEKIGKEFKRIVQRIKDFLRNLVPRTES. In humans, CAMP encodes the peptide precursor CAP-18 (18 kDa), which is processed by proteinase 3-mediated extracellular cleavage into the active form LL-37.

The cathelicidin family includes 30 types of which LL-37 is the only cathelicidin in the human. Cathelicidins are stored in the secretory granules of neutrophils and macrophages and can be released following activation by leukocytes. Cathelicidin peptides are dual-natured molecules called amphiphiles: one end of the molecule is attracted to water and repelled by fats and proteins, and the other end is attracted to fat and proteins and repelled by water. Members of this family react to pathogens by disintegrating, damaging, or puncturing cell membranes.

Cathelicidins thus serve a critical role in mammalian innate immune defense against invasive bacterial infection. The cathelicidin family of peptides are classified as antimicrobial peptides (AMPs). The AMP family also includes the defensins. Whilst the defensins share common structural features, cathelicidin-related peptides are highly heterogeneous. Members of the cathelicidin family of antimicrobial polypeptides are characterized by a highly conserved region (cathelin domain) and a highly variable cathelicidin peptide domain.

Cathelicidin peptides have been isolated from many different species of mammals, including marsupials. Cathelicidins are mostly found in neutrophils, monocytes, mast cells, dendritic cells and macrophages after activation by bacteria, viruses, fungi, parasites or the hormone 1,25-D, which is the hormonally active form of vitamin D. They have been found in some other cells, including epithelial cells and human keratinocytes. Some viruses evolved immunomodulatory mechanisms to avoid cathelicidin exposure by downregulating the cellular vitamin D receptor.

== Etymology ==
The term was coined in 1995 from cathelin, due to the characteristic cathelin-like domain present in cathelicidins. The name cathelin itself is coined from cathepsin L inhibitor in 1989.

== Mechanism of antimicrobial activity ==
The general rule of the mechanism triggering cathelicidin action, like that of other antimicrobial peptides, involves the disintegration (damaging and puncturing) of cell membranes of organisms toward which the peptide is active.

Cathelicidins rapidly destroy the lipoprotein membranes of microbes enveloped in phagosomes after fusion with lysosomes in macrophages. Therefore, LL-37 can inhibit the formation of bacterial biofilms.

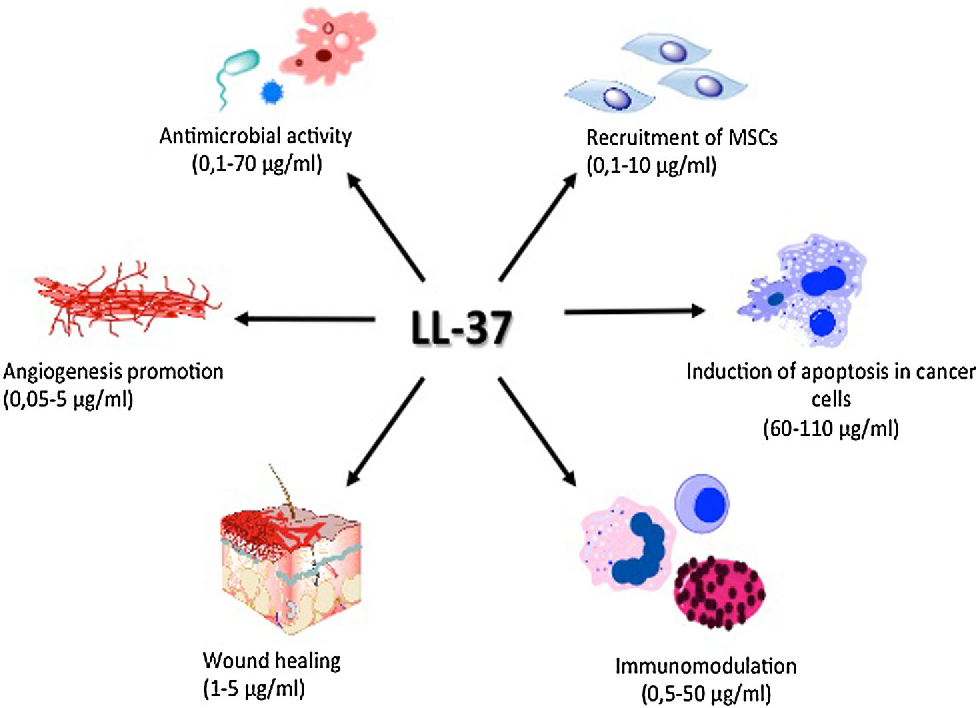
The pleiotropic properties of LL-37 in relation to the different cells and tissues

== Other activities ==
LL-37 plays a role in the activation of cell proliferation and migration, contributing to the wound closure process. All these mechanisms together play an essential role in tissue homeostasis and regenerative processes. Moreover, it has an agonistic effect on various pleiotropic receptors, for example, formyl peptide receptor like-1 (FPRL-1), purinergic receptor P2X7, epidermal growth factor receptor (EGFR).

Furthermore, it induces angiogenesis and regulates apoptosis.

== Characteristics ==
Cathelicidins range in size from 12 to 80 amino acid residues and have a wide range of structures. Most cathelicidins are linear peptides with 23-37 amino acid residues, and fold into amphipathic α-helices. Additionally cathelicidins may also be small-sized molecules (12-18 residues) with beta-hairpin structures, stabilized by one or two disulphide bonds. Even larger cathelicidin peptides (39-80 amino acid residues) are also present. These larger cathelicidins display repetitive proline motifs forming extended polyproline-type structures.

In 1995, Gudmundsson et al. assumed that the active antimicrobial peptide is formed of a 39-residue C-terminal domain (termed FALL-39). However, only a year later stated that the matured AMP, now called LL-37, is in reality two amino acids shorter than FALL-39.

The cathelicidin family shares primary sequence homology with the cystatin family of cysteine proteinase inhibitors, although amino acid residues thought to be important in such protease inhibition are usually lacking.

=== Cleavage products ===
LL-37 is cleaved into a number of smaller fragments which retain anti-microbial and anti-cancer effects but generally have a lower toxicity to human cells. RK-31, KS-30 and KR-20 are naturally occurring fragments, while other related peptides have been made synthetically based on natural fragments of LL-37 during research into cathelicidins, and in some cases have amino acid substitutions.

Cleavage products of LL-37
Code	Fragment	Amino acid sequence
LL-37	1-37	LLGDFFRKSKEKIGKEFKRIVQRIKDFLRNLVPRTES
RK-31	7–37	RKSKEKIGKEFKRIVQRIKDFLRNLVPRTES
KS-30	8–37	KSKEKIGKEFKRIVQRIKDFLRNLVPRTES
KR-20	18–37	KRIVQRIKDFLRNLVPRTES
FK-13	17–29	FKRIVQRIKDFLR
FK-16	17–32	FKRIVQRIKDFLRNLV
KR-12	18–29	KRIVKLIKKWLR
GF-17	16-32	GFKRIVQRIKDFLRNLV
GI-20	12–32	GIKEFKRIVQRIKDFLRNLV

=== Non-human orthologs ===
Cathelicidin peptides have been found in humans, monkeys, mice, rats, rabbits, guinea pigs, pandas, pigs, cattle, frogs, sheep, goats, chickens, horses and wallabies. Antibodies to the human LL-37/hCAP-18 have been used to find cathelicidin-like compounds in a marsupial. About 30 cathelicidin family members have been described in mammals, with only one (LL-37) found in humans. Currently identified cathelicidin peptides include the following:

- Human: hCAP-18 (cleaved into LL-37)
- Rhesus monkey: RL-37
- Mice:CRAMP-1/2, (Cathelicidin-related Antimicrobial Peptide
- Rats: rCRAMP
- Rabbits: CAP-18
- Guinea pig: CAP-11
- Pigs: PR-39, Prophenin, PMAP-23,36,37
- Cattle: BMAP-27,28,34 (Bovine Myeloid Antimicrobial Peptides); Bac5, Bac7
- Frogs: cathelicidin-AL (found in Amolops loloensis)
- Chickens: Four cathelicidins, fowlicidins 1,2,3 and cathelicidin Beta-1
- Tasmanian Devil: Saha-CATH5
- Salmonids: CATH1 and CATH2

== Clinical significance ==
Patients with rosacea have elevated levels of cathelicidin and elevated levels of stratum corneum tryptic enzymes (SCTEs). Cathelicidin is cleaved into the antimicrobial peptide LL-37 by both kallikrein 5 and kallikrein 7 serine proteases. Excessive production of LL-37 is suspected to be a contributing cause in all subtypes of Rosacea. Antibiotics have been used in the past to treat rosacea, but antibiotics may only work because they inhibit some SCTEs.

Lower plasma levels of human cathelicidin antimicrobial protein (hCAP18) appear to significantly increase the risk of death from infection in dialysis patients. The production of cathelicidin is up-regulated by vitamin D.

SAAP-148 (a synthetic antimicrobial and antibiofilm peptide) is a modified version of LL-37 that has enhanced antimicrobial activities compared to LL-37. In particular, SAAP-148 was more efficient in killing bacteria under physiological conditions. In addition, SAAP-148 synergises with the repurposed antibiotic halicin against antibiotic-resistant bacteria and biofilms.

LL-37 is thought to play a role in psoriasis pathogenesis (along with other anti-microbial peptides). In psoriasis, damaged keratinocytes release LL-37 which forms complexes with self-genetic material (DNA or RNA) from other cells. These complexes stimulate dendritic cells (a type of antigen presenting cell) which then release interferon α and β which contributes to differentiation of T-cells and continued inflammation. LL-37 has also been found to be a common auto-antigen in psoriasis; T-cells specific to LL-37 were found in the blood and skin in two thirds of patients with moderate to severe psoriasis.

LL-37 binds to the peptide Ab, which is associated with Alzheimer's disease. An imbalance between LL-37 and Ab may be a factor affecting AD-associated fibrils and plaques. Chronic, oral Porphyromonas gingivalis, and herpesvirus (HSV-1) infections may contribute to the progression of Alzheimer's dementia.

== Applications ==
Research into the AMP family—particularly in regards to their mechanism of action—has been ongoing for nearly 20 years. Despite sustained interest, treatments derived or utilizing AMPs have not been widely adopted for clinical use for several reasons. One, drug candidates from AMPs have a narrow window of bioavailability, because peptides are quickly broken down by proteases. Two, peptide drugs are more expensive than small molecule drugs to produce, which is problematic since peptide drugs must be given in large doses to counter rapid enzymatic breakdown. These qualities also limit routes of administration, typically to injection, infusion, or slow release therapy. Research into new and improved variations derived from cathelicidin continues.

== See also ==
- Antimicrobial peptides
- Innate immune system
- Peptoid
