= Acne necrotica =

Skin condition

- Specialty: Dermatology

Acne necrotica presents with a primary lesion that is a pruritic or painful erythematous follicular-based papule that develops central necrosis and crusting and heals with a varioliform scar.

== Signs and symptoms ==
Usually appearing as a cluster of erythematous papules and papulo-pustules, the lesions are umbilicated, 2-4 mm in diameter, and develop central necrosis within a few days. An adherent hemorrhagic crust forms, but it falls off after 3–4 weeks, leaving varioliform scars.

== Causes ==
In essence, the etiology is unknown. Even though coagulase-positive staphylococci have been grown from pustules, it is challenging to determine the organism's significance. Additionally, Propionibacterium acnes has been linked. Genetic and environmental influences are not fully understood. Mechanical elements like scratching and rubbing merely make the condition worse; they are not the cause. Herpes simplex was found in some patients but not in others.

== Diagnosis ==
Staphylococcus aureus or epidermidis invariably grow in routine aerobic cultures. Numerous intracellular and extracellular gram-positive pleomorphic organisms compatible with Propionibacterium acnes can be seen using Gram stain.

Perifollicular lymphocyte infiltrates and lymphocytic spongiosis of the follicular epithelium are features of early lesions. Sebaceous glands, sebaceous ducts, and the infundibulum are all soon engulfed in sebaceous epithelium necrosis. There may be granulomas of foreign bodies. The epidermis may also necrotize. Both extensive corium necrosis and bleeding are major components. Neutrophils typically don't exist or appear later. Finally, fibrosis is visible.

== Treatment ==
Sometimes systemic antibiotics are beneficial; erythromycin or tetracyclines are suitable options. Systemic corticosteroids reduce inflammation but do not have any therapeutic effects. Trials using oral isotretinoin have yielded inconsistent outcomes. It may be beneficial to take extra precautions like warm compresses to release the crusts and antibacterial washes. Topical tretinoin and benzoyl peroxide don't work. For a brief period, applying a topical corticosteroid lotion could be beneficial in reducing itching.

== See also ==
- Skin lesion
- Cicatricial alopecia
