= Rosacea =

Skin condition, usually on the face

- Other names: Acne rosacea
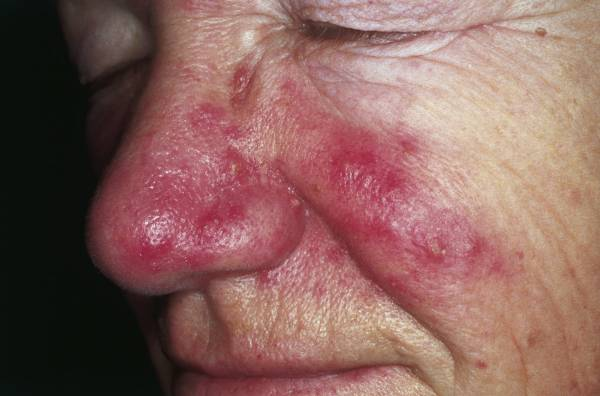
- Rosacea over the cheeks and nose
- Pronunciation: /roʊˈzeɪʃ(i)ə/
- Specialty: Dermatology
- Symptoms: Facial redness, swelling, and small and superficial dilated blood vessels
- Complications: Rhinophyma
- Usual onset: 30–50 years old
- Duration: Long term
- Types: Erythematotelangiectatic, papulopustular, phymatous, ocular
- Causes: Unknown
- Risk factors: Family history
- Diagnostic method: Based on symptoms
- Differential diagnosis: Acne, perioral dermatitis, seborrhoeic dermatitis, dermatomyositis, lupus
- Medication: Antibiotics either by mouth or applied to the skin
- Frequency: ~5%

Rosacea is a long-term skin condition that typically affects the face. It results in redness, pimples, swelling, and small and superficial dilated blood vessels. Often, the nose, cheeks, forehead, and chin are most involved. A red, enlarged nose may occur in severe disease, a condition known as rhinophyma.

The cause of rosacea is unknown. Risk factors include a family history of the condition. Factors that may potentially worsen the condition include heat, exercise, sunlight, cold, spicy food, alcohol, menopause, psychological stress, or use of steroid cream on the face. Diagnosis is based on symptoms.

Rosacea is not curable, but treatment usually improves symptoms. Treatment is typically with metronidazole, doxycycline, minocycline, or tetracycline. When the eyes are affected, azithromycin eye drops may help. Other treatments with tentative benefit include brimonidine cream, ivermectin cream, and isotretinoin. Dermabrasion or laser surgery may also be used. The use of sunscreen is typically recommended.

Rosacea affects between 1% and 10% of people. Those affected are most often 30 to 50 years old and female. Fair-skinned people seem to be more commonly affected. The condition was described in The Canterbury Tales in the 1300s, and possibly as early as the 200s BC by Theocritus.

== Signs and symptoms ==
Commonly affected zones

Rosacea typically begins with reddening (flushing) of the skin in symmetrical patches near the center of the face. Common signs may depend on age and sex: flushing and red swollen patches are common in the young, small and visible dilated blood vessels in older individuals, and swelling of the nose is common in men. Other signs include multiple lumps on the skin (papules, pustules), and swelling of the face. Many people experience stinging or burning pain and rarely, itching.

Rosacea is often triggered or worsened by specific stimuli. The exact risk factors vary from person to person. Some people with rosacea may not be able to identify any consistent factors associated with flare-ups. Common triggers are ultraviolet light, weather temperature, food temperature, spicy foods, exercise, and emotional stress.

=== Erythematotelangiectatic rosacea ===
Erythematotelangiectatic rosacea (also known as "vascular rosacea") is characterized by prominent history of prolonged (more than 10 minutes) flushing reaction to various stimuli, such as emotional stress, hot drinks, alcohol, spicy foods, exercise, cold or hot weather, or hot baths and showers.

=== Glandular rosacea ===
In glandular rosacea, men with thick sebaceous skin predominate, a disease in which the papules are edematous, and the pustules are often 0.5 to 1.0 cm in size, with nodulocystic lesions often present.

== Cause ==
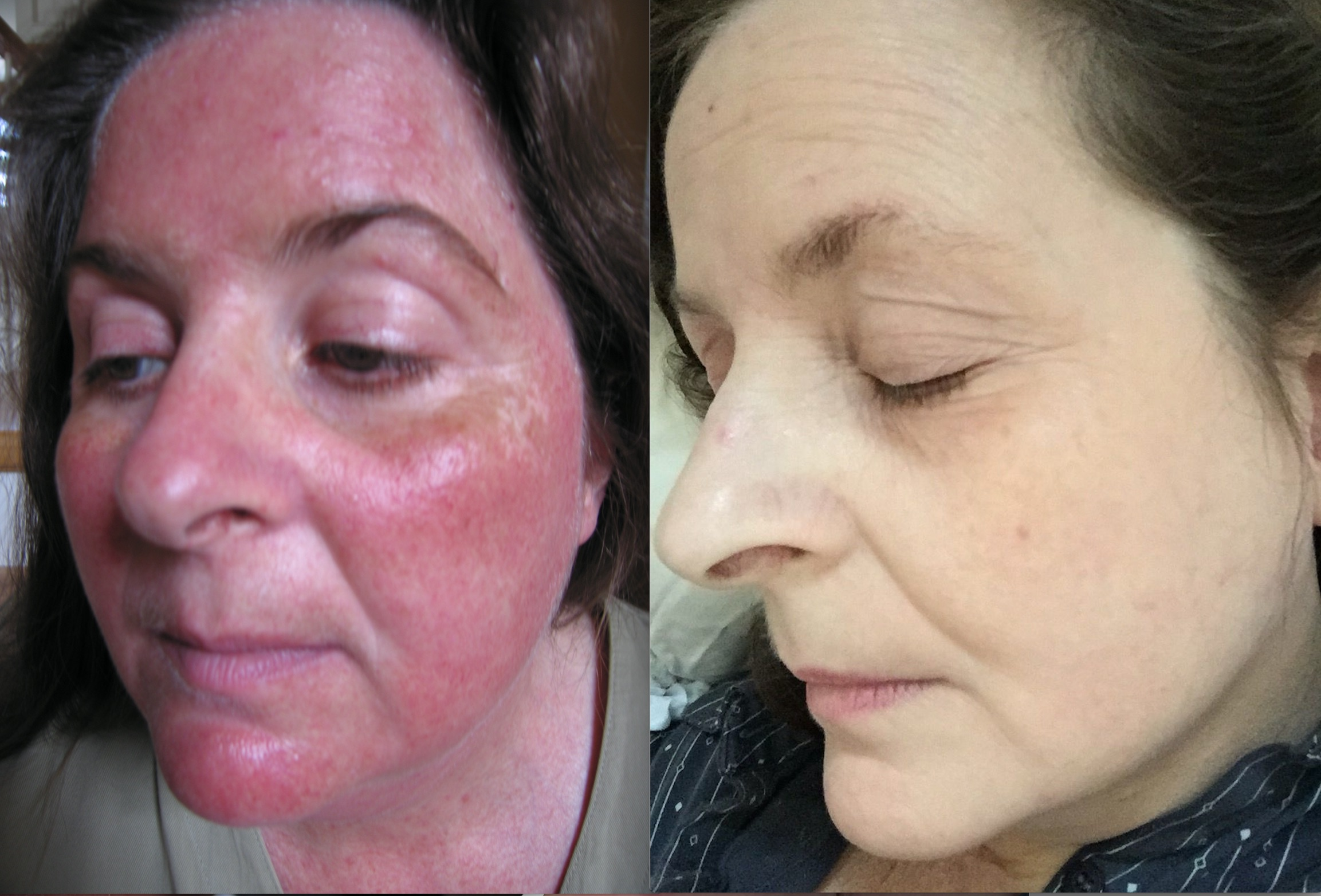
Topical steroid-induced rosacea (left); after steroid withdrawal and photobiomodulation therapy (right)

The exact cause of rosacea is unknown. Triggers that cause episodes of flushing and blushing play a part in its development. Exposure to temperature extremes, strenuous exercise, heat from sunlight, severe sunburn, stress, anxiety, cold wind, and moving to a warm or hot environment from a cold one, such as heated shops and offices during the winter, can each cause the face to become flushed. Certain foods and drinks can also trigger flushing, such as alcohol, foods, and beverages containing caffeine (especially hot tea and coffee), foods high in histamines, and spicy foods.

Medications and topical irritants have also been known to trigger rosacea flares. Some acne and wrinkle treatments reported to cause rosacea include microdermabrasion and chemical peels, as well as high dosages of isotretinoin, benzoyl peroxide, and tretinoin.

Steroid-induced rosacea is caused by topical use of steroids, which are often prescribed for seborrheic dermatitis. Dosage should be slowly decreased and not stopped abruptly to avoid a flare-up.

=== Cathelicidins ===
In 2007, Richard Gallo and colleagues noticed that patients with rosacea had high levels of cathelicidin, an antimicrobial peptide, and elevated levels of stratum corneum tryptic enzymes (SCTEs). Antibiotics have been used in the past to treat rosacea, but they may only work because they inhibit some SCTEs.

=== Demodex mites, Demodex folliculitis and mange ===
Studies of rosacea and Demodex mites have revealed that some people with rosacea have increased numbers of the mite, especially those with steroid-induced rosacea. Demodex folliculitis (demodicidosis, also known as "mange" in other animals) is a condition that may have a "rosacea-like" appearance.

A 2007 National Rosacea Society-funded study demonstrated that Demodex folliculorum mites may be a cause or exacerbating factor in rosacea. The researchers identified Bacillus oleronius as a distinct bacterium associated with Demodex mites. When analyzing blood samples using a peripheral blood mononuclear cell proliferation assay, they discovered that B. oleronius stimulated an immune system response in 79% of 22 patients with subtype 2 (papulopustular) rosacea, compared with only 29% of 17 subjects without the disorder. They concluded, "The immune response results in inflammation, as evident in the papules (bumps) and pustules (pimples) of subtype 2 rosacea. This suggests that the B. oleronius bacteria found in the mites could be responsible for the inflammation associated with the condition."

=== Intestinal bacteria ===
Small intestinal bacterial overgrowth (SIBO) is more prevalent in people with rosacea, and treating it with locally acting antibiotics improved rosacea lesions in two studies. Conversely, in rosacea patients who were SIBO-negative, antibiotic therapy had no effect. The effectiveness of treating SIBO in rosacea patients may suggest that gut bacteria play a role in the pathogenesis of rosacea lesions.

=== Inflammatory bowel disease ===
Inflammatory bowel disease (IBD), including both Crohn's disease and ulcerative colitis, is known to be associated with rosacea, with certain studies even suggesting a causal impact of IBDs on rosacea. Other research suggests the inverse, that rosacea might lead to IBDs. A high-quality meta-analysis (including both of the key studies supporting the single-direction hypotheses, among others) favors a relationship between the two diseases that is bidirectional, or causative in both directions.

Regardless of the direction of causality, it is known that IBD and rosacea share certain pathologic contributors. For example, the single-nucleotide polymorphism rs763035 is located around the BTNL2 gene, a gene that is known to be associated with ulcerative colitis and various autoimmune diseases.

== Diagnosis ==
Most people with rosacea have only mild redness and are never formally diagnosed or treated. No test for rosacea is known. In many cases, a simple visual inspection by a trained healthcare professional is sufficient for diagnosis. In other cases, particularly when pimples or redness on less common parts of the face are present, a trial of common treatments is useful for confirming a suspected diagnosis. The disorder may be confused with or co-exist with acne vulgaris or seborrheic dermatitis.

The presence of a rash on the scalp or ears suggests a different or coexisting diagnosis because rosacea is primarily a facial diagnosis, although it may occasionally appear in these other areas.

=== Classification ===
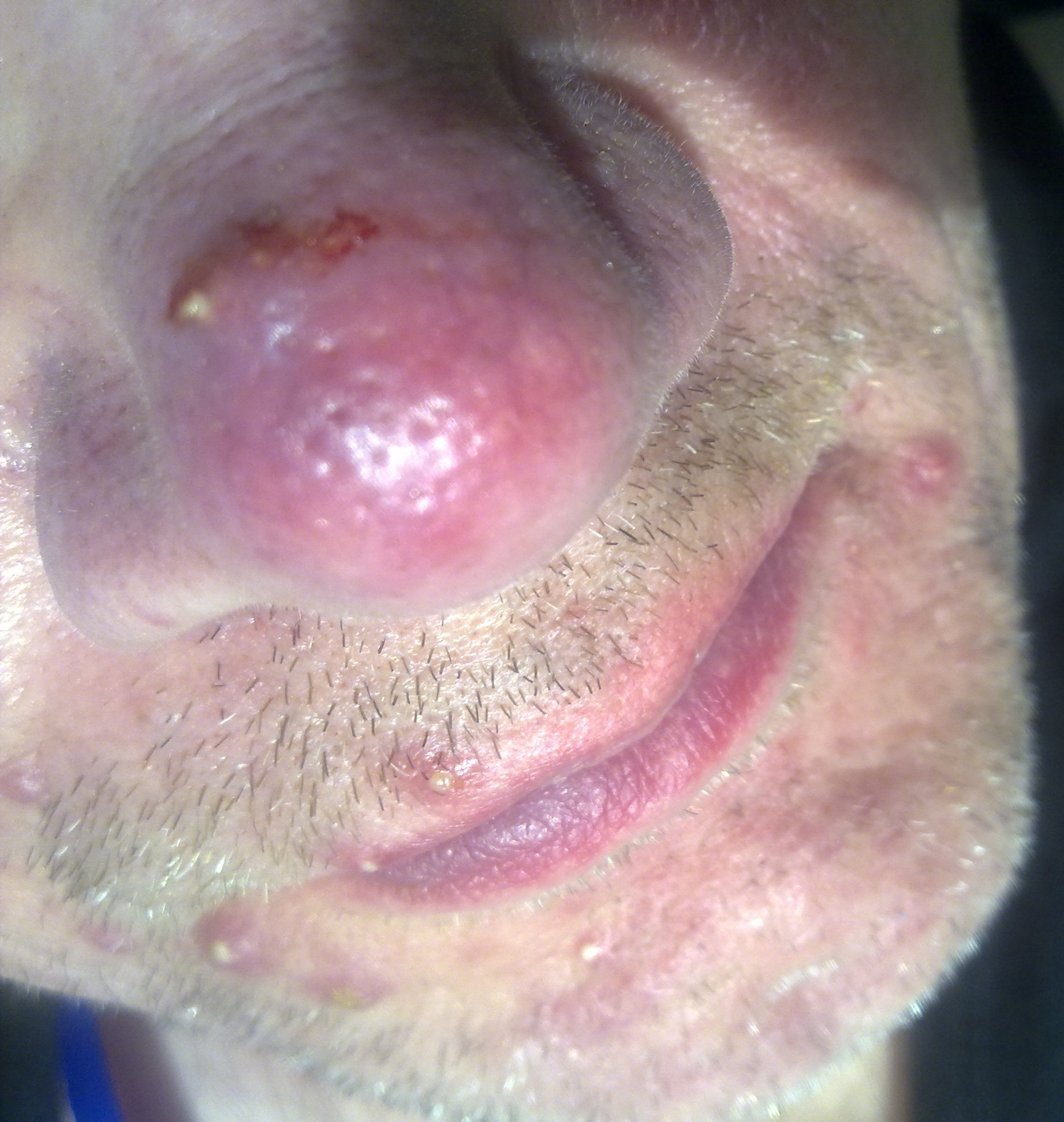
Rosacea on the nose

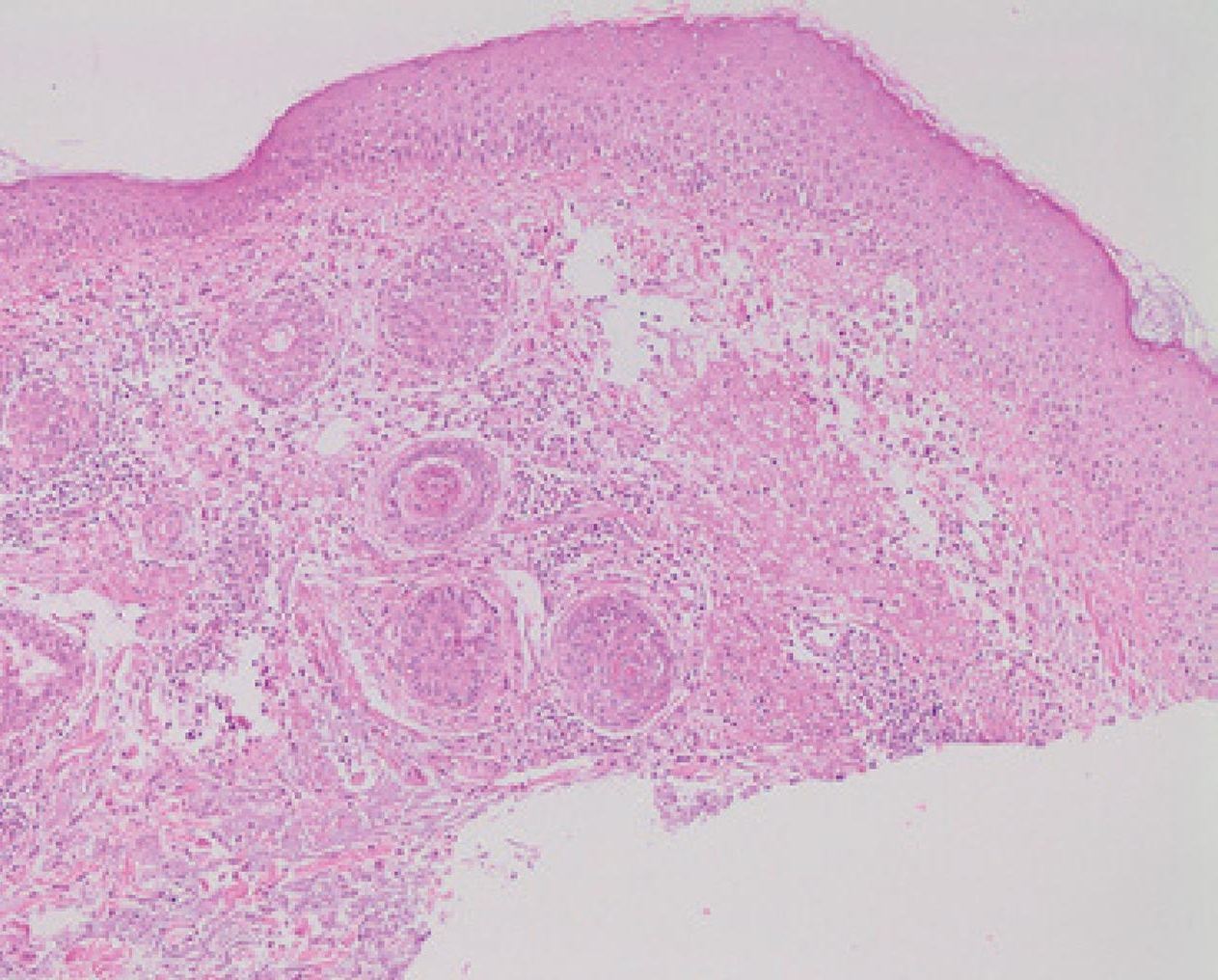
Micrograph showing rosacea as enlarged, dilated capillaries and venules located in the upper dermis, angulated telangiectasias, perivascular and perifollicular lymphocytic infiltration, and superficial dermal edema

Four rosacea subtypes exist, and a patient may have more than one subtype:

1. Erythematotelangiectatic rosacea exhibits permanent redness (erythema) with a tendency to flush and blush easily. Also, small, widened blood vessels visible near the surface of the skin (telangiectasias) and possibly intense burning, stinging, and itching are common. People with this type often have sensitive skin. Skin can also become very dry and flaky. In addition to the face, signs can also appear on the ears, neck, chest, upper back, and scalp.
2. Papulopustular rosacea presents with some permanent redness with red bumps (papules); some pus-filled pustules can last 1–4 days or longer. This subtype is often confused with acne.
3. Phymatous rosacea is most commonly associated with rhinophyma, an enlargement of the nose. Signs include thickening skin, irregular surface nodularities, and enlargement. Phymatous rosacea can also affect the chin (gnathophyma), forehead (metophyma), cheeks, eyelids (blepharophyma), and ears (otophyma). Telangiectasias may be present.
4. In ocular rosacea, affected eyes and eyelids may appear red due to telangiectasias and inflammation, and may feel dry, irritated, or gritty. Other symptoms include foreign-body sensations, itching, burning, stinging, and sensitivity to light. Eyes can become more susceptible to infection. About half of the people with subtypes 1–3 also have eye symptoms. Keratitis is a rare complication that is characterized by blurry vision and vision loss as the cornea is affected.

=== Variants ===
Variants of rosacea include:

- Pyoderma faciale, also known as rosacea fulminans, is a conglobate, nodular disease that arises abruptly on the face.
- Rosacea conglobata is a severe rosacea that can mimic acne conglobata, with hemorrhagic nodular abscesses and indurated plaques.
- Phymatous rosacea is a cutaneous condition characterized by overgrowth of sebaceous glands. Phyma is Greek for swelling, mass, or bulb, and these can occur on the face and ears.

== Treatment ==
The type of rosacea a person has will influence treatment choice. Mild cases are often not treated at all, or are covered up with normal cosmetics.

Therapy for rosacea is not curative and is best measured in terms of a reduction in the amount of facial redness and inflammatory lesions, a decrease in the number, duration, and intensity of flares, and concomitant symptoms of itching, burning, and tenderness. The two primary modalities of rosacea treatment are topical and oral antibiotic agents. Laser therapy has also been classified as a form of treatment. While medications often produce a temporary remission of redness within a few weeks, the redness typically returns shortly after treatment is suspended. Long-term treatment, usually 1–2 years, may result in permanent control of the condition for some patients. Lifelong treatment is often necessary, although some cases resolve after a while and go into permanent remission. Other cases, if left untreated, worsen over time. Some people have also reported better results after changing their diet. This is not confirmed by medical studies, even though some studies relate the histamine production to the outbreak of rosacea.

=== Behavior ===
Certain behavioral changes may improve the symptoms of rosacea or prevent exacerbations. Keeping a symptoms diary to document potential symptom triggers and avoiding those triggers is recommended. Common exacerbating triggers include ultraviolet light and irritant cosmetics, therefore it is recommended that those with rosacea wear sunscreen (with a sun factor protection (SPF) of 30 or greater) and avoid cosmetics. If using cosmetics or makeup is desired, then oil-free foundation and concealer should be used. Skin astringents, products that can dry the skin and impair the skin barrier, including products with alcohol, menthol, peppermint, camphor, or eucalyptus oil should generally be avoided. People should avoid using exfoliating skin scrubs, cosmetics, shampoos and soaps containing sodium laureth sulfate, and waterproof makeup on the affected area, as these products may compromise the skin barrier protection and be difficult to remove. Using soap-free cleansers and non-oily moisturizers is preferred if used on the affected area. Many skin care products have been specifically formulated for those with sensitive skin or those with conditions such as rosacea. Ocular rosacea may be treated with daily gentle eyelid washing using warm water, and artificial tears to lubricate the eye.

Managing pre-trigger events, such as prolonged exposure to cool environments, can directly influence warm-room flushing.

=== Medications ===
Medications with good evidence for treating rosacea include topical metronidazole, ivermectin, brimonidine, and azelaic acid. Good evidence medications taken by mouth include brimonidine, doxycycline, and isotretinoin, with tetracyclines such as doxycycline representing the oral medications preferred by most clinicians. Isotretinoin and tetracycline antibiotics, which may be used in more severe cases of inflammatory rosacea, are absolutely contraindicated in women who are pregnant, may become pregnant, or are lactating as they are highly teratogenic (associated with birth defects). Contraception is required for women of childbearing age who are using these medications.

Metronidazole is thought to act through anti-inflammatory mechanisms, while azelaic acid is thought to decrease cathelicidin production. Oral antibiotics of the tetracycline class, such as doxycycline, minocycline, and oxytetracycline, are also commonly used and thought to reduce papulopustular lesions through anti-inflammatory actions rather than through their antibacterial capabilities.

==== Topical antibiotics ====
Topical minocycline applied as foam is a newer treatment option for rosacea that the FDA has approved. Minocycline shows a targeted approach for managing inflammatory lesions of rosacea while minimizing systemic side effects commonly associated with oral antibiotic use. It is available in foam formulation and is applied to the affected areas once daily. Minocycline belongs to the tetracycline family of antibiotics and exhibits antimicrobial properties and anti-inflammatory activity, similar to other members of this class, such as doxycycline. Topical minocycline reduces inflammatory lesions associated with rosacea; however, rare adverse events such as folliculitis have been reported.

Topical metronidazole is a commonly used treatment for rosacea; it is available in various formulations such as creams, gels, or lotions and applied to clean, dry skin once or twice daily. Topical metronidazole has been shown to effectively reduce inflammatory lesions and perilesional erythema associated with rosacea by inhibiting both microbial growth and pro-inflammatory mediators generated by neutrophils. Benefits of topical metronidazole include its effectiveness in reducing symptoms, extensive clinical experience supporting its use, and generally good tolerability with minimal systemic side effects; still, some patients may experience mild local irritation upon initial use, and it may have a limited impact on persistent facial redness (erythema).

==== Non-antibiotic topical medications ====
===== Azelaic acid =====
Topical azelaic acid is available in gel or cream formulations; it exerts its effects by reducing inflammation through its activity on the cathelicidin pathway, which is upregulated in rosacea-affected skin; it also reduces inflammatory lesions and improves overall symptoms of rosacea; it has been well-studied and shown to be effective in clinical trials; still, some patients may experience mild local irritation during the first few weeks of use.

===== Ivermectin =====
Topical ivermectin is a treatment option for rosacea that targets the Demodex mites associated with inflammation in rosacea patients' skin; the cream is applied once daily to clean, dry skin. Topical ivermectin has been shown to reduce Demodex mite density and improve cutaneous inflammatory markers in clinical studies; overall, it decreases Demodex mite density and improves the symptoms of roseacea-associated inflammation; however, some patients may experience transient burning or itching upon application. Topical ivermectin offers a targeted approach for managing rosacea by addressing the role of Demodex mites in the disease process. A review found that ivermectin was more effective than alternatives for the treatment of papulopustular acne rosacea. An ivermectin cream has been approved by the FDA, as well as in Europe, for the treatment of inflammatory lesions of rosacea. The treatment is based upon the hypothesis that parasitic mites of the genus Demodex play a role in rosacea. In a clinical study, ivermectin reduced lesions by 83% over 4 months, as compared to 74% under a metronidazole standard therapy. Quassia amara extract at 4% demonstrated to have clinical efficacy for rosacea.

===== Encapsulated benzoyl peroxide =====
Encapsulated benzoyl peroxide (E-BPO) cream is an FDA-approved topical agent for inflammatory lesions of rosacea, which uses porous silica microcapsules to slow benzoyl peroxide absorption and reduce potential irritation.

==== Oral antibiotics ====
Systemic doxycycline modified-release capsules are commonly used to treat rosacea, and other oral tetracyclines may be used less commonly. The capsules are taken orally once daily, usually in a low dose, to achieve anti-inflammatory effects. Doxycycline acts by inhibiting inflammation, reducing the production of reactive oxygen species, matrix metalloproteases and kallikrein 5. The benefits of systemic doxycycline include its effectiveness in reducing inflammatory lesions, improving erythema, and controlling symptoms related to ocular involvement in rosacea patients; it is also well-tolerated at lower doses compared to traditional higher-dose regimens used for other indications. However, potential cons include gastrointestinal side effects such as nausea or abdominal pain, photosensitivity reactions that require sun protection measures during treatment, and rare instances of antibiotic-associated diarrhea or bacterial resistance development with long-term use.

==== Non-antibiotic oral medications ====
Oral Beta-blockers are often used for flushing due to rosacea. These include nadolol, propranolol or carvedilol. The possible adverse reactions of the oral beta-blockers include low blood pressure, low heart rate, or dizziness. The oral α-2 adrenergic receptor agonist clonidine can also be used for flushing symptoms. The flushing and blushing that typically accompany rosacea may also be treated with the topical application of alpha agonists such as brimonidine which has vasoconstrictor activity and achieves maximal symptom improvement 3–6 hours after application, other topicals used for flushing or erythema include oxymetazoline or xylometazoline.

In addition to short-term reduction of symptoms, it has been suggested that beta-blockers may inhibit angiogenesis, contributing to subtle improvement long-term. The benefits of beta blockers are generally thought to only be effective for treating erythematotelangiectatic rosacea, as opposed to a more modest ability to control symptoms in cases of papulopustular rosacea.

==== Other ====
Cyclosporin eye drops have been shown to reduce symptoms in those with ocular rosacea. Cyclosporin should not be used in those with an active ocular infection. Other options include topical metronidazole cream or topical fusidic acid applied to the eyelids, or oral doxycycline in more severe cases of ocular rosacea. If papules and pustules persist, isotretinoin can be prescribed.

=== Phototherapy ===
Nd:YAG lasers, intense pulsed light, and pulsed dye lasers are techniques for phototherapy of rosacea. Typically, they are used to reduce the appearance of telangiectasias, which are abnormal surface-level blood vessels. These therapies cause selective photothermolysis of hemoglobin in local vessels, resulting in their destruction without causing vessel ruptures and bruising.

== Outcomes ==
The highly visible nature of rosacea symptoms is often psychologically challenging for those affected. People with rosacea may experience issues with self-esteem, socializing, and changes to their thoughts, feelings, and coping mechanisms.

== Epidemiology ==
Rosacea affects around 5% of people worldwide. Incidence varies by ethnicity, and is particularly prevalent in those of Celtic heritage. Men and women are equally likely to develop rosacea.

== See also ==
- Seborrheic dermatitis
- Keratosis pilaris
