= Mark L. Nelson =

American chemist

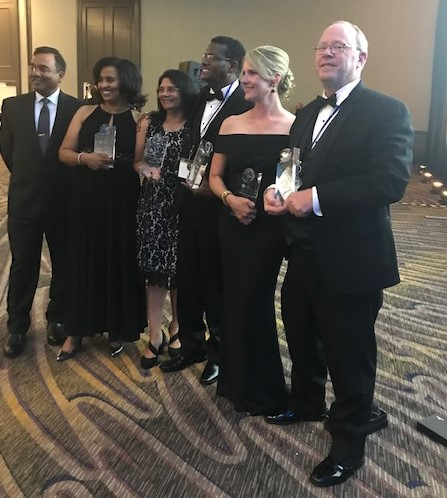
- Nelson first from right
- Born: 1960 (age 65–66)
- Education: Bachelor of Science (BS), Chemistry and Microbiology, Ph.D, Medicinal Chemistry and Molecular Pharmacology
- Alma mater: Tufts University; Temple University; Gannon University
- Occupations: Chemist and inventor
- Years active: 1990-present
- Known for: Drug Discovery, medicinal chemistry
- Spouse: Janice Badger Nelson
- Children: 1
- Awards: ACS Heroes of Chemistry Award - 2019, Fulbright Lectureship Fellow, Cairo, Egypt, 1996, Distinguished Alumni Award, 2003 Gannon University
- Website: appliedmoleculardesign.com

Mark L. Nelson (born 1960) is an American chemist specializing in the field of antibiotics and tetracyclines. His synthesis techniques have resulted in over 40 patents and he conceived and synthesized with Mohamed Ismail along with Laura Honeyman and Kwasi Ohemeng, the tetracycline antibiotic Omadacycline (Nuzyra), the first of the Aminomethylcycline subclass of tetracyclines to reach medical use.

== Research ==
His current research is directed at modulating alpha-proteobacteria and related mitochondria and their signaling processes, and new compounds are in pre-clinical studies affecting activated immune cells showing promise against the secondary effects of stroke, hypoxia and neurodegeneration, in studies funded by the Department of Defense, with Marc Halterman, PhD, MD.

Other tetracycline compounds that are non-antibiotic compounds effective against mitochondrial processes are being studied with Johan Auwerx at EPFL, Lausanne, Switzerland, and Andrew Dillin at the University of California, Berkeley.

In agriculture and with the USDA and the Citrus Research Development Foundation his research has led to series of compounds active against Huanglongbing, known as Citrus Greening, an infectious disease in citrus caused by this invasive species of alpha-proteobacteria that has devastated the Florida citrus industry, and compounds from his labs completed field studies showing potent activity in sparing citrus trees from this pathogen also known as Liberibacter asiaticus (Candidatus).

In the field of archaeobiology Nelson is first author of Mass spectroscopic characterization of tetracycline in the skeletal remains of an ancient population from Sudanese Nubia 350–550 CE, published in 2010, which reported that ancient civilizations were producing antibiotics and used them to treat diseases. His work used anhydrous hydrogen fluoride to dissolve mummy bones found in Nubia followed by mass spectroscopic characterization. This research was chronicled in the documentary "How Beer Saved the World" produced by the Discovery Channel.

He also is known for his scientific research into the non-antibiotic uses of the tetracyclines and for his work on the history of the compounds and in chemoinformatics, drug design innovation and chemical discovery.

Omadacycline was developed at Tufts University School of Medicine by a research team led by Nelson. Working alongside Mohamed Ismail at Tufts, Nelson played a role in applying chemistry methods to tetracycline scaffolds. His team synthesized over 3,000 new derivatives, ultimately leading to the discovery of novel third-generation tetracycline compounds, including omadacycline and sarecycline.

Nuzyra is useful against resistant bacteria and used for severe cases of skin infections, ABSSSIs, Community Acquired Pneumonia (CABP) and nontuberculosis mycobacteria. Nuzyra also has demonstrated activity against Anthrax, and was purchased by the US government under a BARDA contract for Project Bio-shield to treat anthrax exposure (Bacillus anthracis), and is now in the Strategic National Stockpile in the US in case of a bioterrorism attack. Nuzyra was also approved for use against the Plague, caused by Yersinia pestis infections.

== Awards ==
Nelson received a Fulbright Lectureship Fellow Award, Cairo, Egypt, for his research into antibiotic resistance mechanisms working with the National Research Center, the Distinguished Alumni Award in Science at Gannon University (2003) and more recently he received the 2019 American Chemistry Society Heroes of Chemistry award for his synthetic and biological work leading to the marketed drugs Nuzyra and Seysara, which were approved by the FDA in October 2018 for use as antibiotics in health and medicine.
