= Tetracycline antibiotics =

Type of broad-spectrum antibiotic

Skeletal formula of tetracycline with atoms and four rings numbered and labeled.

Tetracyclines are a group of broad-spectrum antibiotic compounds that have a common basic structure and are either isolated directly from several species of Streptomyces bacteria or produced semi-synthetically from them. Tetracycline molecules comprise a linear fused tetracyclic nucleus (rings designated A, B, C and D) to which a variety of functional groups are attached. Tetracyclines are named after their four ("tetra-") hydrocarbon rings ("-cycl-") derivation ("-ine"). They are defined as a subclass of polyketides, having an octahydrotetracene-2-carboxamide skeleton and are known as derivatives of polycyclic naphthacene carboxamide. While all tetracyclines have a common structure, they differ from each other by the presence of chloro, methyl, and hydroxyl groups. These modifications do not change their broad antibacterial activity, but do affect pharmacological properties such as half-life and binding to proteins in serum.

Tetracyclines were discovered in the 1940s and exhibited activity against a wide range of microorganisms including gram-positive and gram-negative bacteria, chlamydiota, mycoplasmatota, rickettsiae, and protozoan parasites. Tetracycline itself was discovered later than chlortetracycline and oxytetracycline but is still considered as the parent compound for nomenclature purposes. Tetracyclines are among the cheapest classes of antibiotics available and have been used extensively in prophylaxis and in treatment of human and animal infections, as well as at subtherapeutic levels in animal feed as growth promoters.

Tetracyclines are growth inhibitors (bacteriostatic) rather than killers of the infectious agent (bacteriocidal) and are only effective against multiplying microorganisms. They are short-acting and passively diffuse through porin channels in the bacterial membrane. They inhibit protein synthesis by binding reversibly to the bacterial 30S ribosomal subunit and preventing the aminoacyl tRNA from binding to the A site of the ribosome. They also bind to some extent the bacterial 50S ribosomal subunit and may alter the cytoplasmic membrane causing intracellular components to leak from bacterial cells.

Tetracyclines all have the same antibacterial spectrum, although there are differences in species' sensitivity to types of tetracyclines. Tetracyclines inhibit protein synthesis in both bacterial and human cells. Bacteria have a system that allows tetracyclines to be transported into the cell, whereas human cells do not. Human cells therefore are spared the effects of tetracycline on protein synthesis.

Tetracyclines retain an important role in medicine, although their usefulness has been reduced with the onset of antibiotic resistance. Tetracyclines remain the treatment of choice for some specific indications. Because not all of the tetracycline administered orally is absorbed from the gastrointestinal tract, the bacterial population of the intestine can become resistant to tetracyclines, resulting in overgrowth of resistant organisms. The widespread use of tetracyclines is thought to have contributed to an increase in the number of tetracycline-resistant organisms, in turn rendering certain infections more resilient to treatment. Tetracycline resistance is often due to the acquisition of new genes, which code for energy-dependent efflux of tetracyclines or for a protein that protects bacterial ribosomes from the action of tetracyclines. Furthermore, a limited number of bacteria acquire resistance to tetracyclines by mutations.

== Medical uses ==
Tetracyclines are generally used in the treatment of infections of the urinary tract, respiratory tract, and the intestines and are also used in the treatment of chlamydia, especially in patients allergic to β-lactams and macrolides; however, their use for these indications is less popular than it once was due to widespread development of resistance in the causative organisms. Tetracyclines are widely used in the treatment of moderately severe acne and rosacea (tetracycline, oxytetracycline, doxycycline or minocycline). Anaerobic bacteria are not as susceptible to tetracyclines as are aerobic bacteria. Doxycycline is also used as a prophylactic treatment for infection by Bacillus anthracis (anthrax) and is effective against Yersinia pestis, the infectious agent of bubonic plague. It is also used for malaria treatment and prophylaxis, as well as treating elephantitis filariasis. Tetracyclines remain the treatment of choice for infections caused by chlamydia (trachoma, psittacosis, salpingitis, urethritis and L. venereum infection), Rickettsia (typhus, Rocky Mountain spotted fever), brucellosis and spirochetal infections (Lyme disease/borreliosis and syphilis). They are also used in veterinary medicine. They may have a role in reducing the duration and severity of cholera, although drug-resistance is mounting and their effect on overall mortality is questioned.

== Side effects ==
Side-effects from tetracyclines are not common, but of particular note is phototoxicity. It increases the risk of sunburn under exposure to light from the sun or other sources. This may be of particular importance for those intending to take on vacations long-term doxycycline as a malaria prophylaxis. They may cause stomach or bowel upsets, and, on rare occasions, allergic reactions. Very rarely, severe headache and vision problems may be signs of dangerous secondary intracranial hypertension, also known as idiopathic intracranial hypertension. Tetracyclines are teratogens due to the likelihood of causing teeth discolouration in the fetus as they develop in infancy. For this same reason, tetracyclines are contraindicated for use in children under 8 years of age. Some adults also experience teeth discoloration (mild grey hue) after use. They are, however, safe to use in the first 18 weeks of pregnancy. Some patients taking tetracyclines require medical supervision because they can cause steatosis and liver toxicity.

=== Cautions ===
Tetracyclines should be used with caution by those with liver impairment. Also, because the molecules are soluble in water it can worsen kidney failure (this is not true of the lipid-soluble agents doxycycline and minocycline). They may increase muscle weakness in myasthenia gravis and exacerbate systemic lupus erythematosus. Antacids containing aluminium and calcium reduce the absorption of all tetracyclines, and dairy products reduce absorption greatly for all but minocycline. The breakdown products of tetracyclines are toxic and can cause Fanconi syndrome, a potentially fatal disease affecting proximal tubular function in the nephrons of the kidney. Prescriptions of these drugs should be discarded once expired because they can cause hepatotoxicity. It was once believed that tetracycline antibiotics impair the effectiveness of many types of hormonal contraception. Recent research has shown no significant loss of effectiveness in oral contraceptives while using most tetracyclines. Despite these studies, many physicians still recommend the use of barrier contraception for people taking any tetracyclines to prevent unwanted pregnancy. In tetracycline preparation, stability must be considered in order to avoid formation of toxic epi-anhydrotetracyclines.

=== Contraindications ===
Tetracycline use should be avoided in pregnant or lactating women, and in children with developing teeth because they may result in permanent staining (dark yellow-gray teeth with a darker horizontal band that goes across the top and bottom rows of teeth), and possibly affect the growth of teeth and bones. Usage during the first 12 weeks of pregnancy does not appear to increase the risk of any major birth defects. There may be a small increased risk for minor birth defects such as an inguinal hernia, but the number of reports is too small to be sure if there actually is any risk.

== Mechanism of action ==
Tetracycline antibiotics are protein synthesis inhibitors. They inhibit the initiation of translation in variety of ways by binding to the 30S ribosomal subunit, which is made up of 16S rRNA and 21 proteins. They inhibit the binding of aminoacyl-tRNA to the mRNA translation complex. One publication has shown that tetracyclines interact strongly with both double-stranded RNA and ribosomal RNA. Tetracyclines also have been found to broadly inhibit matrix metalloproteinases. This mechanism does not add to their antibiotic effects, but has led to extensive research on chemically modified tetracyclines or CMTs (like incyclinide) for the treatment of rosacea, acne, diabetes and various types of cancers. It has been shown that tetracyclines are not only active against broad spectrum of bacteria, but also against certain protozoa, like Plasmodium falciparum. The binding of tetracyclines to dsRNA (double stranded RNA) may be an explanation for their wide range of effects. It can also be partly attributed to the nature of ribosomal protein synthesis pathways among bacteria. Incyclinide was announced to be ineffective for rosacea in September 2007. Several trials have examined modified and unmodified tetracyclines for the treatment of human cancers; of those, very promising results were achieved with CMT-3 for patients with Kaposi Sarcoma.

== Structure-activity relationship ==
Tetracyclines are composed of a rigid skeleton of 4 fused rings. The rings structure of tetracyclines is divided into an upper modifiable region and a lower non modifiable region. An active tetracycline requires a C10 phenol as well as a C11-C12 keto-enol substructure in conjugation with a 12a-OH group and a C1-C3 diketo substructure. Removal of the dimethylamine group at C4 reduces antibacterial activity. Replacement of the carboxylamine group at C2 results in reduced antibacterial activity but it is possible to add substituents to the amide nitrogen to get more soluble analogs like the prodrug lymecycline. The simplest tetracycline with measurable antibacterial activity is 6-deoxy-6-demethyltetracycline and its structure is often considered to be the minimum pharmacophore for the tetracycle class of antibiotics. C5-C9 can be modified to make derivatives with varying antibacterial activity.

== Mechanism of resistance ==
Cells can become resistant to tetracycline by enzymatic inactivation of tetracycline, efflux, ribosomal protection, reduced permeability and ribosome mutation.

Inactivation is the rarest type of resistance, where NADPH-dependent oxidoreductase, a class of antibiotic destructase, modifies the tetracycline antibiotic at their oxidative soft spot leading to an inactivation of the tetracycline antibiotic. For example, the oxireductase makes a modification on the C11a site of oxytetracycline. Both Mg^{2+}chelation and ribosome binding are required for the biological activity of oxytetracycline and the modification attenuate the binding, leading to inactivation of the oxytetracycline antibiotic.

In the most common mechanism of reaction, efflux, various resistance genes encode a membrane protein that actively pumps tetracycline out of the cell by exchanging a proton for a tetracycline cation complex. This exchange leads to a reduced cytoplasmic concentration of tetracycline.

In ribosomal protection, a resistance gene encodes a protein that can have several effects, depending on what gene is transferred. Twelve classes of ribosomal protection genes/proteins have been found.

Possible mechanisms of action of these protective proteins include:

1. blocking tetracyclines from binding to the ribosome
2. binding to the ribosome and distorting the structure to still allow t-RNA binding while tetracycline is bound
3. binding to the ribosome and dislodging tetracycline

== Administration ==
When ingested, it is usually recommended that the more water-soluble, short-acting tetracyclines (plain tetracycline, chlortetracycline, oxytetracycline, demeclocycline and methacycline) be taken with a full glass of water, either two hours after eating or two hours before eating. This is partly because most tetracyclines bind with food and also easily with magnesium, aluminium, iron and calcium, which reduces their ability to be completely absorbed by the body. Dairy products, antacids and preparations containing iron should be avoided near the time of taking the drug. Partial exceptions to these rules occur for doxycycline and minocycline, which may be taken with food (though not iron, antacids, or calcium supplements). Minocycline can be taken with dairy products because it does not chelate calcium as readily, although dairy products do decrease absorption of minocycline slightly.

== History ==
The history of the tetracyclines involves the collective contributions of thousands of dedicated researchers, scientists, clinicians, and business executives. Tetracyclines were discovered in the 1940s, first reported in scientific literature in 1948, and exhibited activity against a wide range of microorganisms. The first members of the tetracycline group to be described were chlortetracycline and oxytetracycline. Chlortetracycline (Aureomycin) was first discovered as an ordinary item in 1945 and initially endorsed in 1948 by Benjamin Minge Duggar, a 73-year-old emeritus professor of botany employed by American Cyanamid – Lederle Laboratories, under the leadership of Yellapragada Subbarow. Duggar derived the substance from a Missouri soil sample, golden-colored, fungus-like, soil-dwelling bacterium named Streptomyces aureofaciens. About the same time as Lederle discovered aureomycin, Pfizer was scouring the globe for new antibiotics. Soil samples were collected from jungles, deserts, mountaintops, and oceans. But ultimately oxytetracycline (terramycin) was isolated in 1949 by Alexander Finlay from a soil sample collected on the grounds of a factory in Terre Haute, Indiana. It came from a similar soil bacterium named Streptomyces rimosus. From the beginning, terramycin was a molecule enveloped in controversy. It was the subject of the first mass-marketing campaign by a modern pharmaceutical company. Pfizer advertised the drug heavily in medical journals, eventually spending twice as much on marketing as it did to discover and develop terramycin. Still, it turned Pfizer, then a small company, into a pharmaceutical giant. The Pfizer group, led by Francis A. Hochstein, in loose collaboration with Robert Burns Woodward, determined the structure of oxytetracycline, enabling Lloyd H. Conover to successfully produce tetracycline itself as a synthetic product. In 1955, Conover discovered that hydrogenolysis of aureomycin gives a deschloro product that is just as active as the original product. This proved for the first time that chemically modified antibiotics could have biological activity. Within a few years, a number of semisynthetic tetracyclines had entered the market, and now most antibiotic discoveries are of novel active derivatives of older compounds. Other tetracyclines were identified later, either as naturally occurring molecules, e.g., tetracycline from S. aureofaciens, S. rimosus, and S. viridofaciens and dimethyl-chlortetracycline from S. aureofaciens, or as products of semisynthetic approaches, e.g., methacycline, doxycycline, and minocycline.

Research conducted by anthropologist George J. Armelagos and his team at Emory University showed that ancient Nubians from the post-Meroitic period (around AD 350) had deposits of chlortetracycline in their bones, detectable through analyses of cross-sections through ultraviolet light – the deposits are fluorescent. Armelagos suggested that this was due to ingestion of the local ancient beer (very much like the contemporary Egyptian beer), made from contaminated stored grains.

=== Development ===
Tetracyclines were noted for their broad spectrum antibacterial activity and were commercialized with clinical success beginning in the late 1940s to the early 1950s. The second-generation semisynthetic analogs and more recent third-generation compounds show the continued evolution of the tetracycline platform towards derivatives with increased potency as well as efficacy against tetracycline-resistant bacteria, with improved pharmacokinetic and chemical properties. Shortly after the introduction of tetracycline therapy, the first tetracycline-resistant bacterial pathogen was identified. Since then, tetracycline-resistant bacterial pathogens have continued to be identified, limiting tetracycline's effectiveness in treatment of bacterial disease.

Glycylcyclines and fluorocyclines are new classes of antibiotics derived from tetracycline. These tetracycline analogues are specifically designed to overcome two common mechanisms of tetracycline resistance, namely resistance mediated by acquired efflux pumps and/or ribosomal protection. In 2005, tigecycline, the first member of a new subgroup of tetracyclines named glycylcyclines, was introduced to treat infections that are resistant to other antimicrobials. Although it is structurally related to minocycline, alterations to the molecule resulted in its expanded spectrum of activity and decreased susceptibility to the development of resistance when compared with other tetracycline antibiotics. Like minocycline, tigecycline binds to the bacterial 30S ribosome, blocking the entry of transfer RNA. This ultimately prevents protein synthesis and thus inhibiting bacterial growth. However, the addition of an N,N,-dimethylglycylamido group at the 9 position of the minocycline molecule increases the affinity of tigecycline for the ribosomal target up to 5 times when compared with minocycline or tetracycline. This allows for an expanded spectrum of activity and decreased susceptibility to the development of resistance. While tigecycline was the first tetracycline approved in over 20 years, other, newer versions of tetracyclines are currently in human clinical trials.

== List of tetracycline antibiotics ==
Antibiotic (INN)	Source	Half-life	Notes
Tetracycline	Naturally occurring	6–8 hours (short)	
Chlortetracycline	Naturally occurring	6–8 hours (short)	
Oxytetracycline	Naturally occurring	6–8 hours (short)	
Demeclocycline	Naturally occurring	12 hours (intermediate)	
Lymecycline	Semi-synthetic	6–8 hours (short)	
Meclocycline	Semi-synthetic	6–8 hours (short)	(no longer marketed)
Methacycline	Semi-synthetic	12 hours (intermediate)	
Minocycline	Semi-synthetic	16+ hours (long)	
Rolitetracycline	Semi-synthetic	6–8 hours (short)	
Doxycycline	Semi-synthetic	16+ hours (long)	
Tigecycline	16+ hours (long)		
Eravacycline	Next-generation semi-synthetic	16+ hours (long)	(formerly known as TP-434) received FDA approval on August 27, 2018, for treatment of complicated intra-abdominal infections.
Sarecycline	Next-generation semi-synthetic	16+ hours (long)	(formerly known as WC 3035) received FDA approval on October 1, 2018, for treatment of moderate to severe acne vulgaris. Sarecycline is a narrow-spectrum antibiotic.
Omadacycline	Next-generation semi-synthetic	16+ hours (long)	(formerly known as PTK-0796) received FDA approval on October 2, 2018, for treatment of community-acquired pneumonia and acute skin and skin structure infections.

== Use as research reagents ==
Members of the tetracycline class of antibiotics are often used as research reagents in in vitro and in vivo biomedical research experiments involving bacteria as well in experiments in eukaryotic cells and organisms with inducible protein expression systems using tetracycline-controlled transcriptional activation. The mechanism of action for the antibacterial effect of tetracyclines relies on disrupting protein translation in bacteria, thereby damaging the ability of microbes to grow and repair; however protein translation is also disrupted in eukaryotic mitochondria leading to effects that may confound experimental results. It can be used as an artificial biomarker in wildlife to check if wild animals are consuming a bait that contains a vaccine or medication. Since it is fluorescent and binds to calcium, a UV lamp can be used to check if it is in a tooth pulled from an animal. For example, it was used to check uptake of oral rabies vaccine baits by raccoons in the USA. However, this is an invasive procedure for the animal and labour-intensive for the researcher. Therefore, other dyes such as rhodamine B that can be detected in hair and whiskers are preferred.

== See also ==
- Glycylcycline
- Tetracycline controlled transcriptional activation
- Animal Drug Availability Act 1996
