= Streptomyces alboflavus =

Scientific classification
- Domain: Bacteria
- Kingdom: Bacillati
- Phylum: Actinomycetota
- Class: Actinomycetes
- Order: Streptomycetales
- Family: Streptomycetaceae
- Genus: Streptomyces
- Species: S. alboflavus

Binomial name
- Streptomyces alboflavus (Waksman and Curtis 1916) Waksman and Henrici 1948 (Approved Lists 1980)

Type strain
- AS 4.1461, ATCC 12626, ATCC 23874, BCRC 13664, CBS 613.68, CCRC 13664, CGMCC 4.1461, CGMCC 4.1995, CIP 104427, DSM 40045, ETH 17382, ETH 31557, IFO 13196, IFO 3438, IMET 42936, IMRU 3008, ISP 5045, JCM 4615, KCC S-0615, KCCM 12088, KCTC 9674, KCTC 9748, Lanoot R-8729, LMG 19364, NBRC 13196, NBRC 3438, NRRL B-1273, NRRL B-2373, NRRL B-B-2373, NRRL-ISP 5045, PSA 223, R-8729, RIA 1112, VKM Ac-972, Waksman 3008

Synonyms
- Actinomyces alboflavus

Species of bacterium

Streptomyces alboflavus is a bacterium species from the genus of Streptomyces which produces oxytetracycline, tetracycline and desertomycin A.

== See also ==
- List of Streptomyces species
