= Antimicrobial spectrum =

Method of assessing antibiotics

The antimicrobial spectrum of an antibiotic means the range of microorganisms it can kill or inhibit. Antibiotics can be divided into broad-spectrum antibiotics, extended-spectrum antibiotics and narrow-spectrum antibiotics based on their spectrum of activity. Detailedly, broad-spectrum antibiotics can kill or inhibit a wide range of microorganisms; extended-spectrum antibiotic can kill or inhibit Gram positive bacteria and some Gram negative bacteria; narrow-spectrum antibiotic can only kill or inhibit limited species of bacteria.

Currently no antibiotic's spectrum can completely cover all types of microorganisms.

== Determination ==
The antimicrobial spectrum of an antibiotic can be determined by testing its antimicrobial activity against a wide range of microbes in vitro . Nonetheless, the range of microorganisms which an antibiotic can kill or inhibit in vivo may not always be the same as the antimicrobial spectrum based on data collected in vitro.

== Significance ==
Narrow-spectrum antibiotics have low propensity to induce bacterial resistance and are less likely to disrupt the microbiome (normal microflora). On the other hand, indiscriminate use of broad-spectrum antibiotics may not only induce the development of bacterial resistance and promote the emergency of multidrug-resistant organisms, but also cause off-target effects due to dysbiosis. They may also have side effects, such as diarrhea or rash. Generally, a broad antibiotic has more clinical indications, and therefore are more widely used. The Healthcare Infection Control Practices Advisory Committee (HICPAC) recommends the use of narrow-spectrum antibiotics whenever possible.

== Examples ==
- Broad-spectrum antibiotic: Ciprofloxacin, Doxycycline, Minocycline, Tetracycline, Imipenem, Azithromycin
- Extended-spectrum antibiotic: Ampicillin
- Narrow-spectrum antibiotic: Sarecycline, Vancomycin, Isoniazid

== See also ==
- Antibiotic
- Methicillin-resistant Staphylococcus aureus (MRSA)
