= Tooth discoloration =

- Other names: Tooth staining
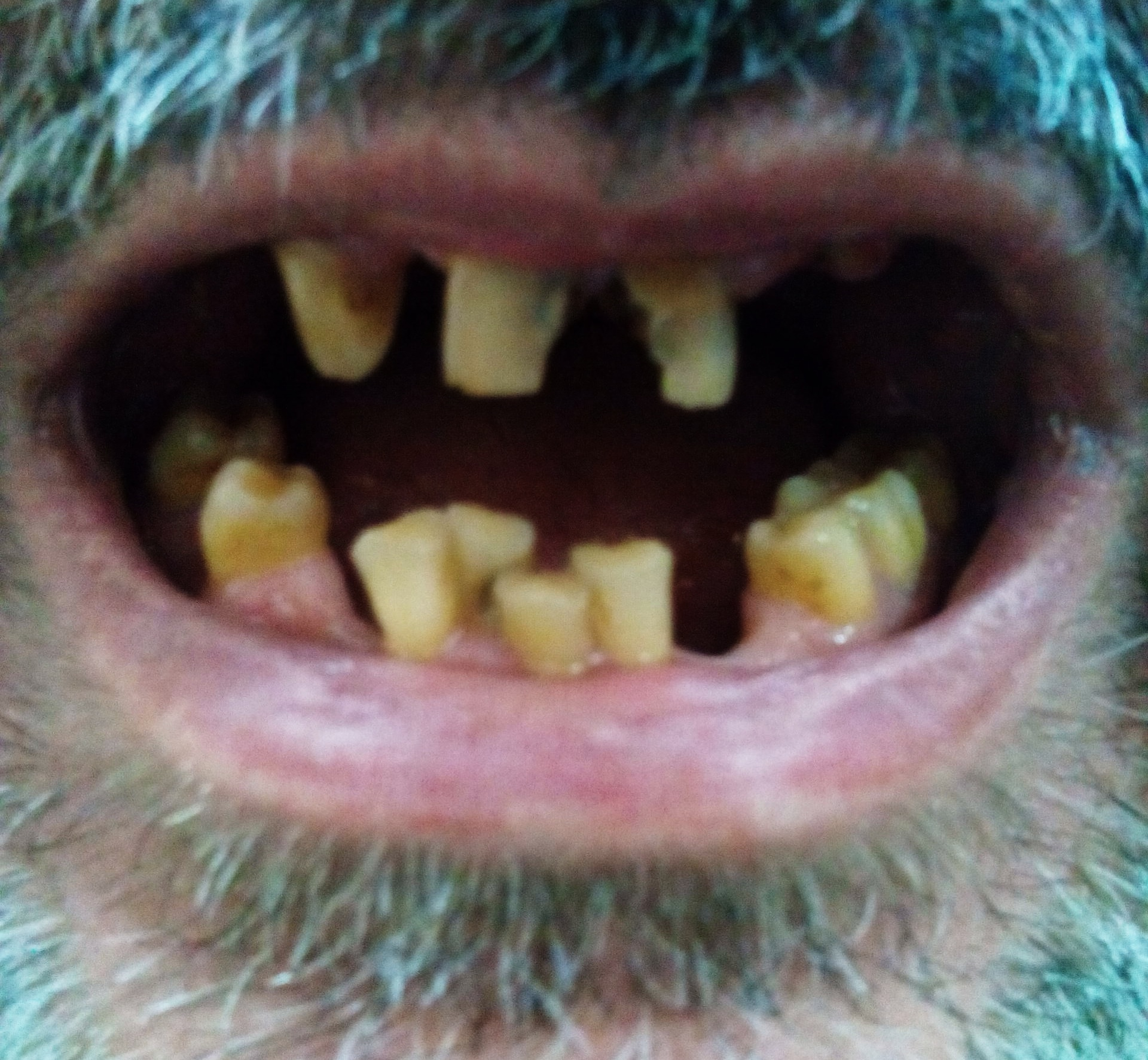
- Specialty: Dentistry

Tooth discoloration is abnormal tooth color, hue or translucency. External discoloration is accumulation of stains on the tooth surface. Internal discoloration is due to absorption of pigment particles into tooth structure. Sometimes there are several different co-existent factors responsible for discoloration.

== Normal tooth shade ==
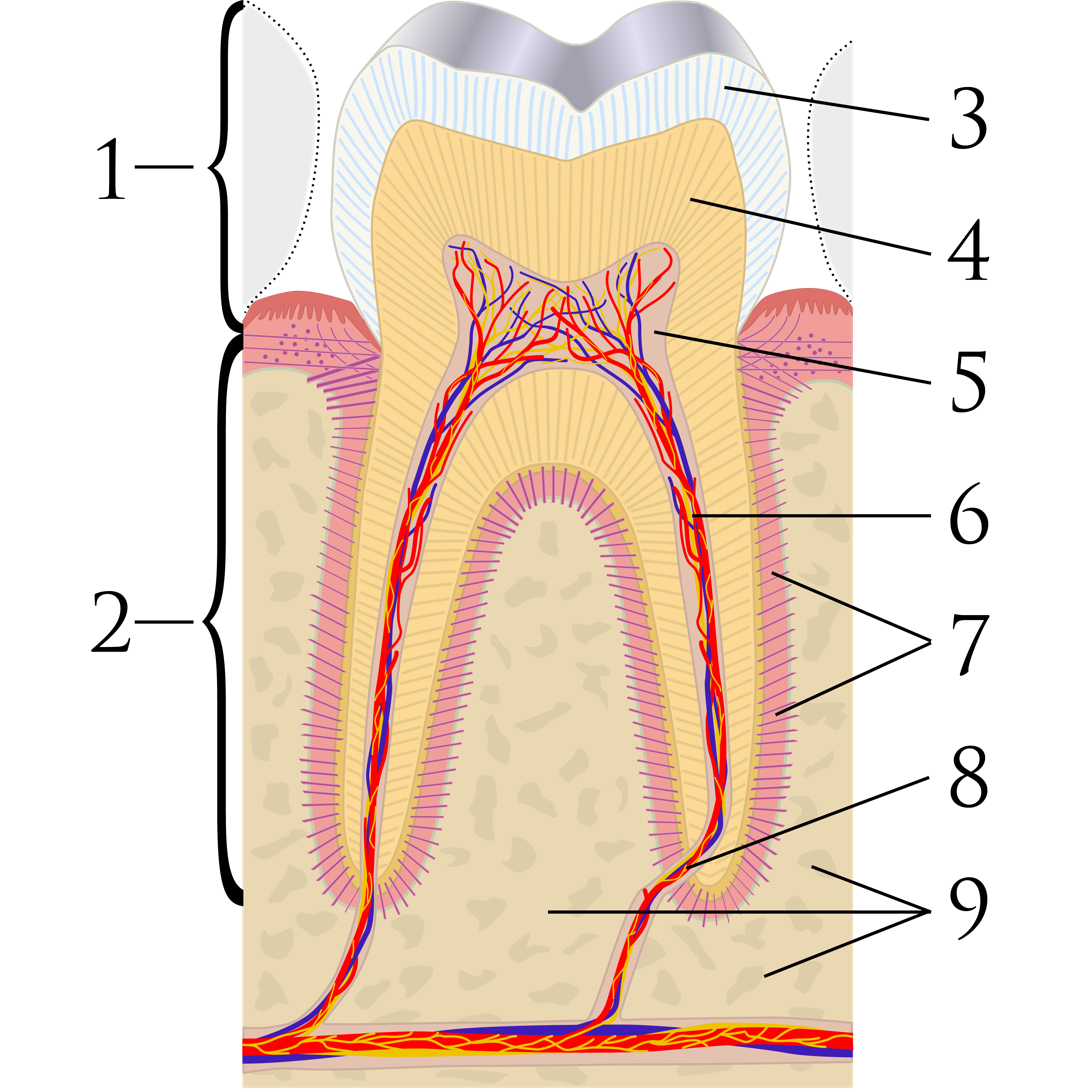
Cross-sectional diagram of a molar tooth. 1: crown, 2: root, 3: enamel, 4: dentin and dentin tubules, 5: pulp chamber, 6: blood vessels and nerve within root canal, 7: periodontal ligament, 8: apex and periapical region, 9: alveolar bone

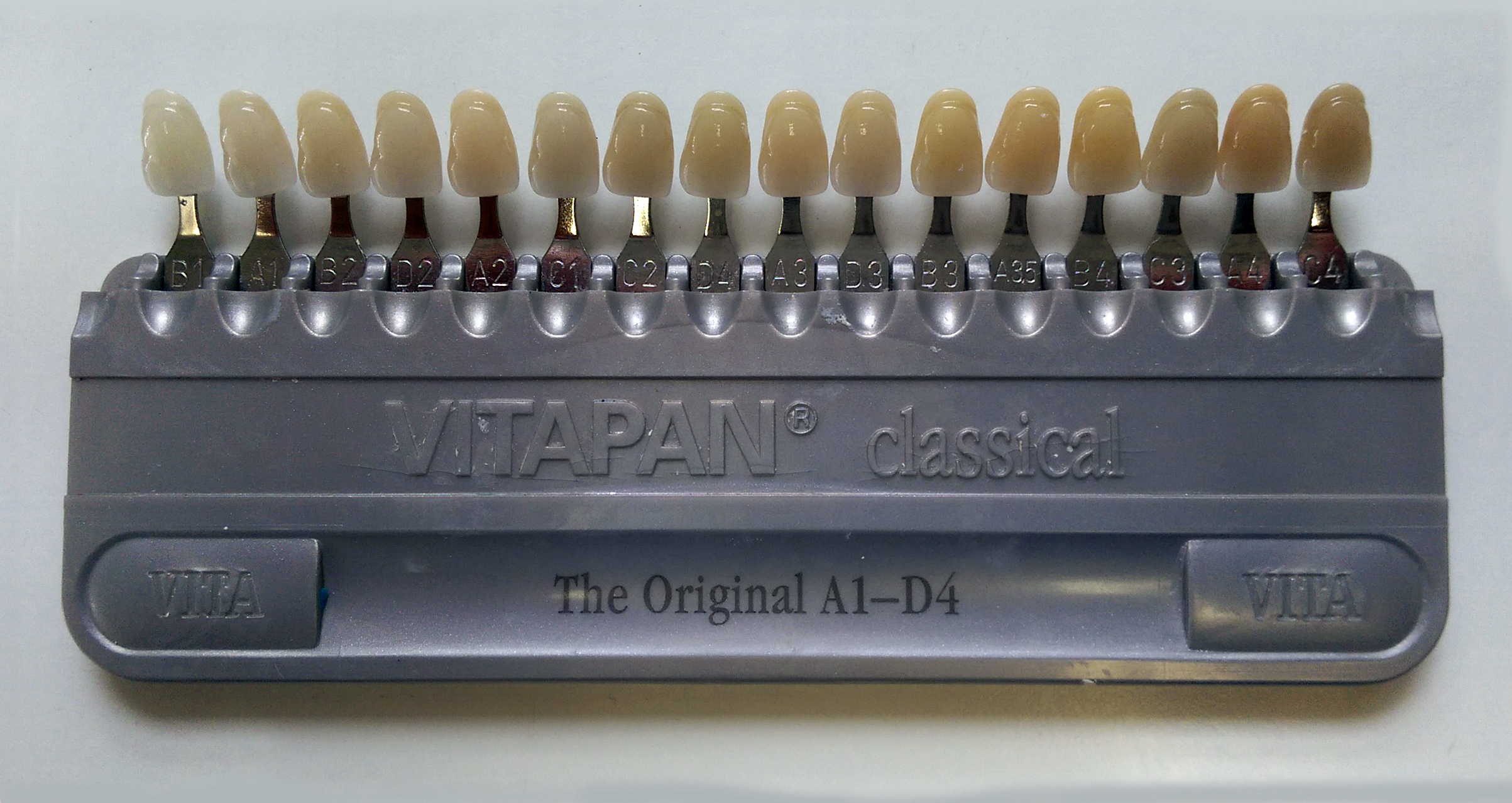
VITA classical A1-D4 shade guide arranged according to value

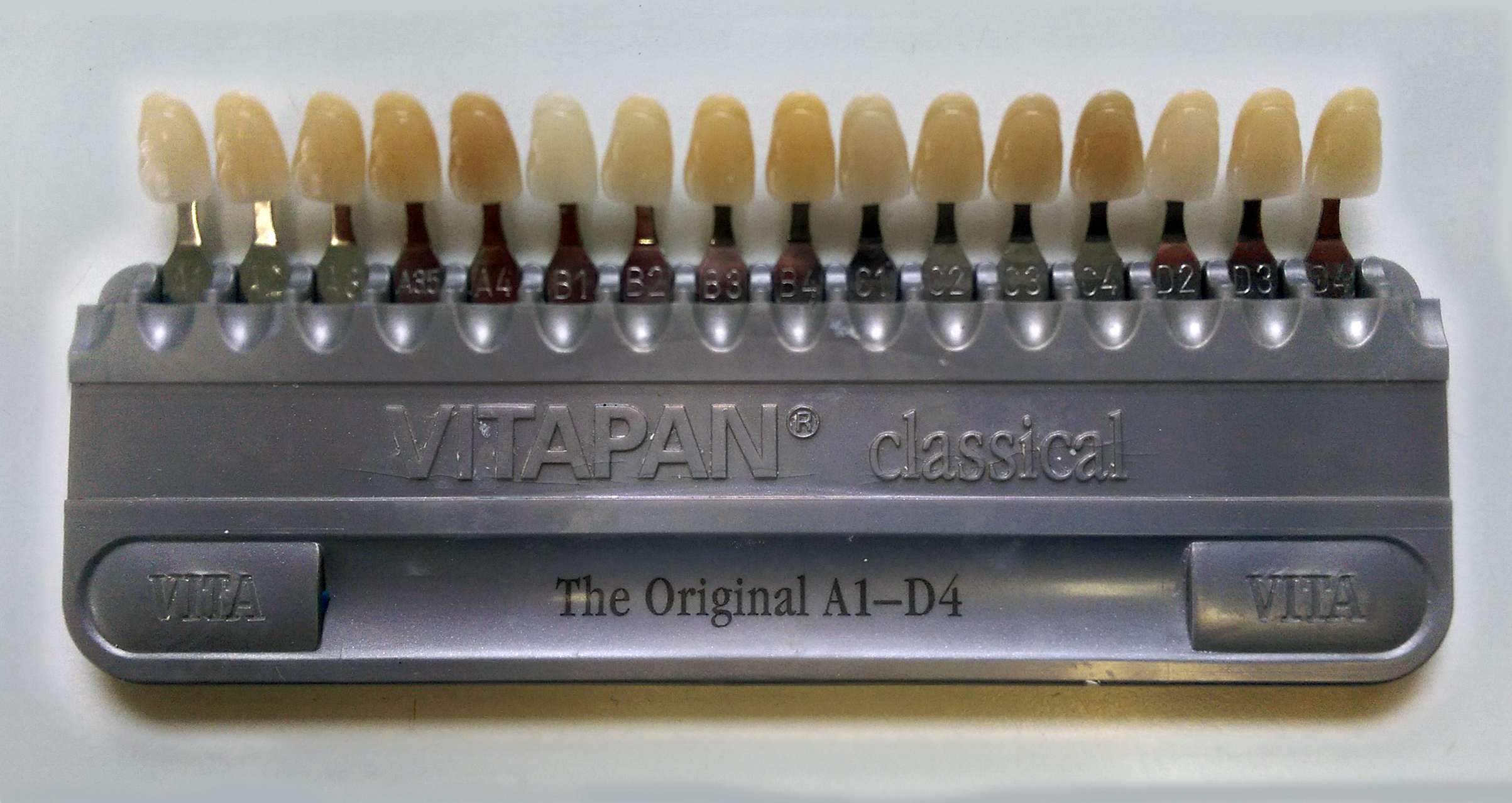
VITA classical A1-D4 shade guide arranged according to chroma; A: red-brown, B: red-yellow, C: grey, D: red-grey

The appearance and perception of a tooth is the result of a complex interaction of factors such as lighting conditions, translucency, opacity, light scattering, gloss and the human eye and brain. Of these, the intrinsic pigmentation of a tooth is the most influential, which in turn is determined by genetic and natural factors. Light hitting a tooth undergoes reflection, absorption and transmission by varying degrees in each tissue layer of the tooth substance. Reflected light detected by the human eye determines the perceived appearance of a tooth.

Teeth have a thin enamel layer on the outer surface. The enamel layer is whiter and semitransparent, and contributes blue, pink green tints to the tooth color. The underlying dentin layer is darker than enamel, yellow-brown in color, and less transparent. Dentin forms the bulk of the tooth substance, and contributes most to the overall tooth color. At the core of the tooth is soft connective tissue termed the dental pulp. The pulp is pink/red due to its vascularity, but is rarely visible through the overlying enamel and dentin unless the thickness of these layers is reduced by tooth wear (or rarely internal resorption).

Public opinion of what is normal tooth shade tends to be distorted. Portrayals of cosmetically enhanced teeth are common in the media. In one report, the most common tooth shade in the general population ranged from A1 to A3 on the VITA classical A1-D4 shade guide.

Tooth color varies according to race, gender and geographic region. Females generally have slightly whiter teeth than males, partly because females' teeth are smaller, and therefore there is less bulk of dentin, partially visible through the enamel layer. For the same reason, larger teeth such as the molars and the canine (cuspid) teeth tend to be darker. Baby teeth (deciduous teeth) are generally whiter than the adult teeth that follow, again due to differences in the ratio of enamel to dentin.

== Causes ==
=== Extrinsic discoloration ===
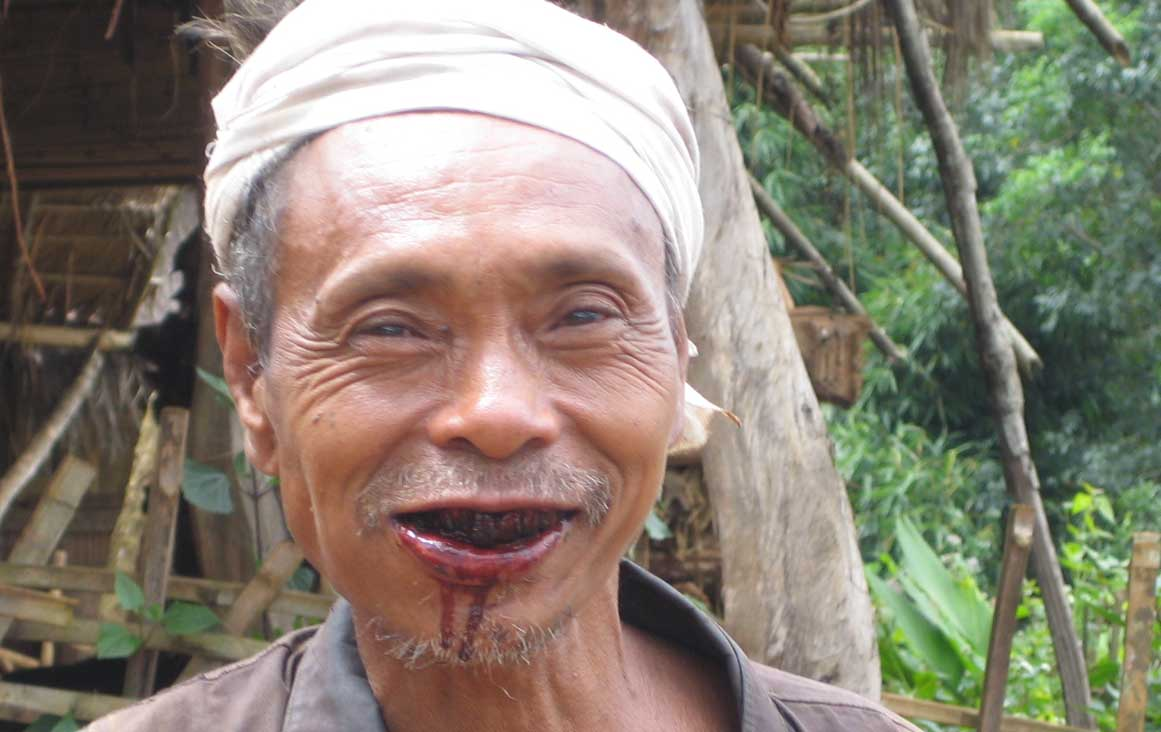
The stained teeth of a regular betel chewer in Burma

Extrinsic discolorations are common and have many different causes. The same range of factors are capable of staining the surface of restorations (e.g., composite fillings, porcelain crowns). Some extrinsic discolorations that are allowed to remain for a long time may become intrinsic.

- Dental plaque: Although usually virtually invisible on the tooth surface, plaque may become stained by chromogenic bacteria such as Actinomyces species.
- Calculus: Neglected plaque eventually calcifies, and leads to formation of a hard deposit on the teeth, especially around the gumline. The color of calculus varies, and may be grey, yellow, black or brown.
- Tobacco: Tar in smoke from tobacco products (and also smokeless tobacco products) tends to form a yellow-brown-black stain around the necks of the teeth above the gumline.
- Betel chewing.
- Pigments in food and drink may cause staining if frequently consumed. Foods, such as vegetables, that are rich with carotenoids or xanthonoids can stain teeth. Ingesting certain drinks, such as tea, coffee, red wine and cola, may cause staining. Frequent consumption of black tea can cause tooth discoloration due to high levels of theaflavin and tannins.
- Certain topical medications.
  - Chlorhexidine (antiseptic mouthwash) binds to tannins, meaning that prolonged use in persons who consume coffee, tea or red wine is associated with extrinsic staining (i.e., removable staining) of teeth.
  - Cetylpyridinium chloride, which is found in many antimicrobial mouthwashes, can result in staining due to dead bacterial residue.
- Metallic compounds. Exposure to such metallic compounds may be in the form of medication or other environmental exposure. Examples include iron (black stain), iodine (black), copper (green), nickel (green) and cadmium (yellow-brown).
- Antibiotics. Tetracycline and its derivatives are capable of intrinsic discoloration (discussed below). However other antibiotics may form insoluble complexes with calcium, iron and other elements that cause extrinsic staining.

=== Intrinsic discoloration ===
Causes of intrinsic discoloration generally fall into those that occur during tooth development and those acquired later in life. The known causes of intrinsic staining are listed below, however some causes are unknown.

==== Dental caries ====
Dental caries (tooth decay) begins as an opaque white spot on the surface of the enamel. As demineralization progresses, the various lesion eventually cavitates and the underlying brown color becomes visible.

==== Fluorosis ====
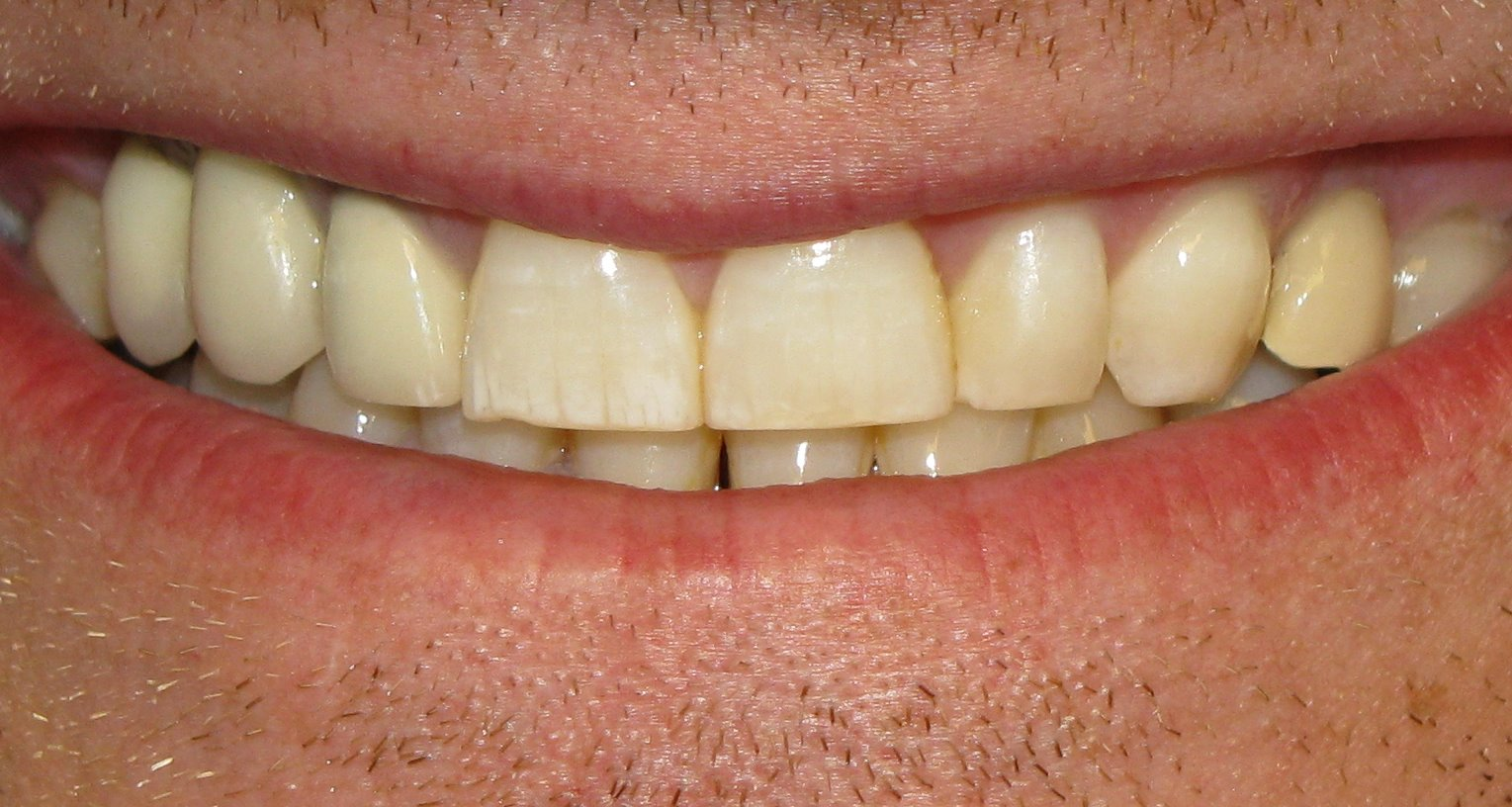
Mild fluorosis: mostly on the upper right central incisor

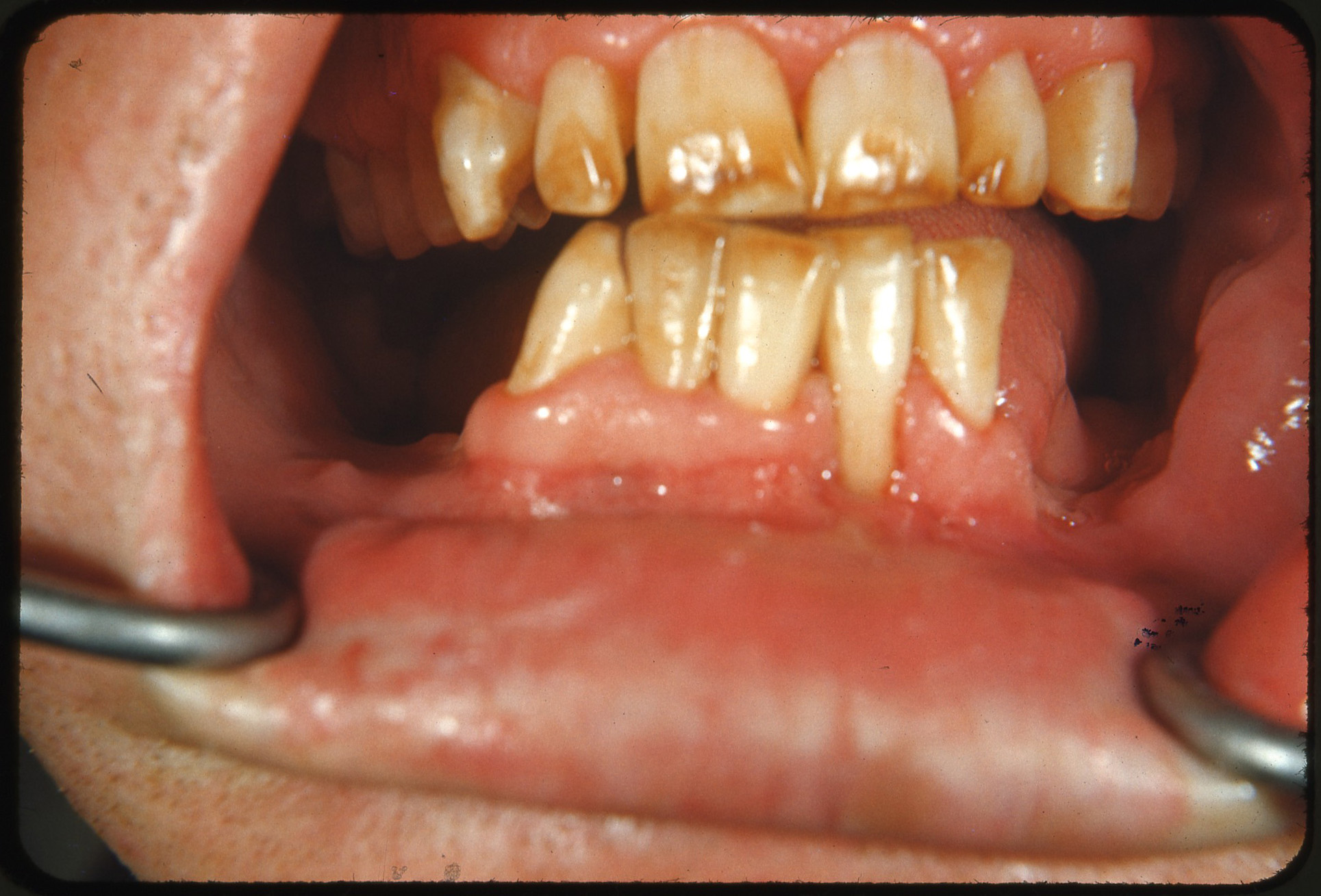
Severe fluorosis: mottled enamel of an individual from a region with high levels of naturally occurring fluoride

Fluorosis may occur when there is chronic and excessive exposure to fluoride during the years of tooth development. Fluoride is a naturally occurring mineral in water, although some regions have higher levels than others, and in some areas fluoride is added to water supplies in low levels to help prevent tooth decay. Exposure can also occur via bottled water and fluoride toothpaste. In its mildest form, fluorosis appears as small opaque white flecks on the enamel surface. More severe cases show severely hypoplastic patches of enamel, which are also prone to accumulation of surface stains. Chronological, fine white bands of fluorosis may be seen that correspond to the times of high exposure to fluoride.

==== Trauma ====
Dental trauma may result in discolorations. Following luxation injuries red discoloration may develop almost instantly. This is due to severance of the venous microcirculation to a tooth, while the arteries continue to supply blood to the pulp. The blood is then decomposed gradually and a blue-brown discoloration develops.

Teeth may turn grey following trauma-induced pulp necrosis (death of the pulp). This discoloration typically develops weeks or months after the injury and is caused by incorporation of pigments released during the breakdown of the pulpal tissue and blood into the dentin.

Yellow discoloration may occur following pulp canal obliteration, i.e., the sealing up of the pulp. Trauma to a developing adult tooth (e.g., intrusion of a baby tooth into the bone) may affect the enamel layer of the adult tooth. This becomes apparent when the adult tooth erupts into the mouth.

==== Pulp necrosis ====
Teeth die mainly as a result of extensive tooth decay, however this may also occur following dental trauma or heavy drilling down of the tooth during tooth preparation prior to restoration.

==== Internal resorption ====
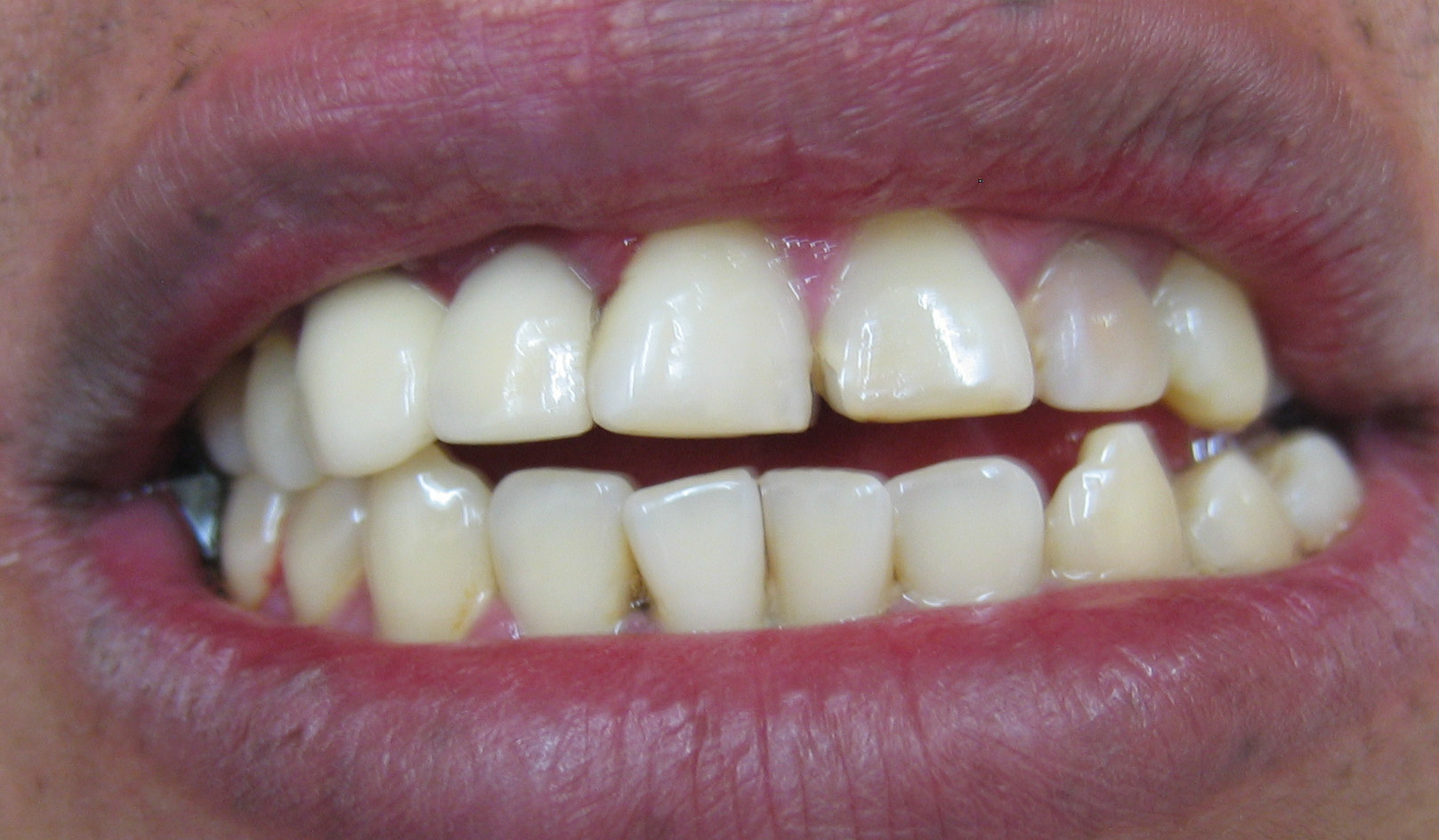
Internal resorption of the left maxillary lateral incisor (right in photograph), giving rise to the appearance termed "Pink tooth of Mummery"

Internal resorption may sometimes follow dental trauma (although in other cases it appears unrelated). This is where the dentin is resorbed and replaced instead by hyperplastic, vascular pulp tissue. As this process starts to approach the external surface of the tooth, a pink hue of this replacement pulp tissue may become visible through the remaining overlying tooth substance. This appearance is sometimes termed "pink tooth of Mummery".

==== Root canal treatment ====
Internal staining is common following root canal treatment; however, the exact causes for this are not completely understood. Failure to completely clean out the necrotic soft tissue of the pulp system may cause staining, and certain root canal materials (e.g., gutta percha and root canal sealer cements) can also. Another possible factor is the lack of pulp pressure in dentinal tubules once the pulp is removed, leading to incorporation of dietary stains in dentin.

==== Amalgam fillings ====
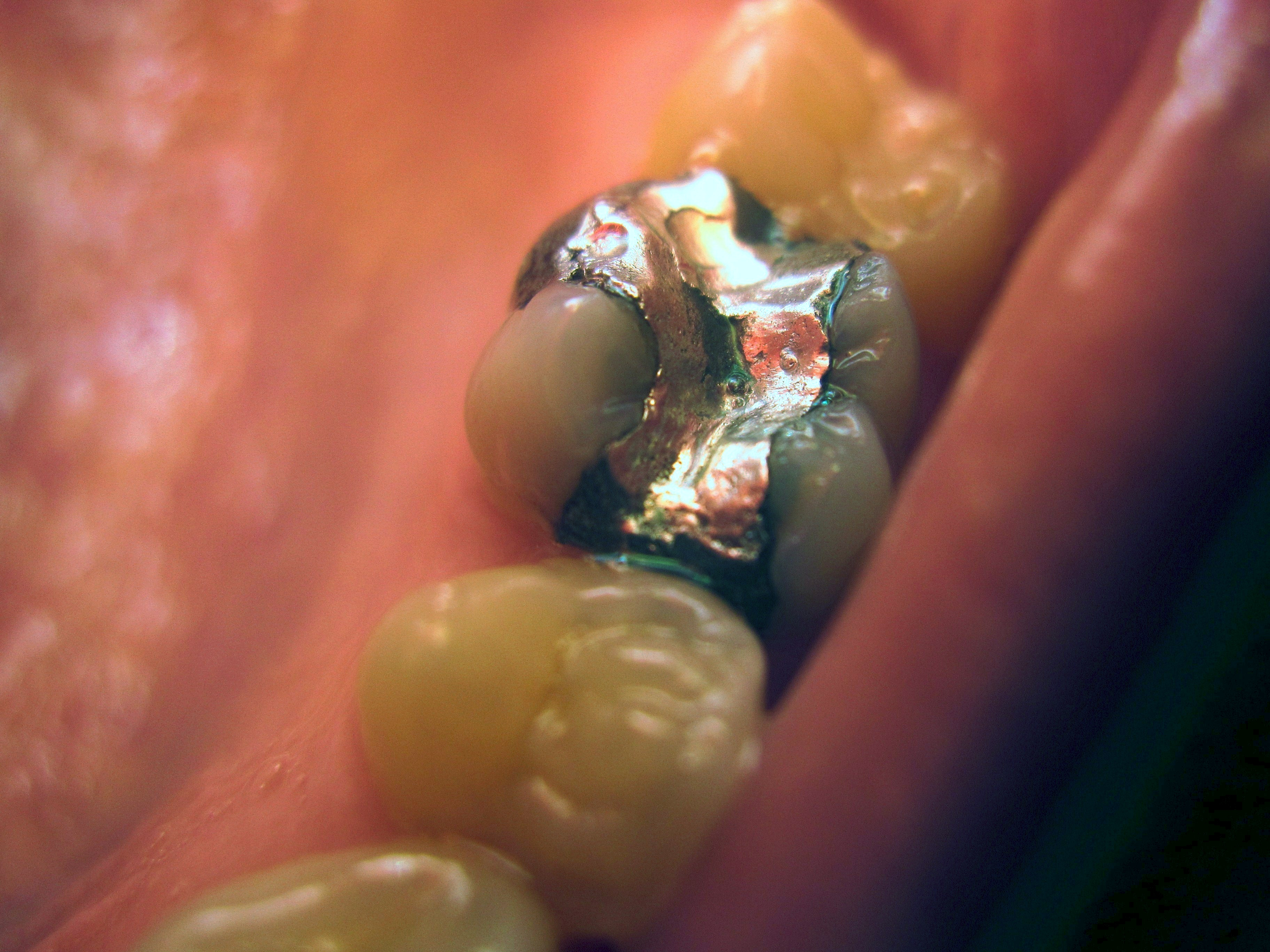
Amalgam filling: giving overall darker appearance to the tooth

Amalgam fillings often stain the tooth they are placed in. This is most noticeable in very old fillings, as pigment slowly leaches out of the amalgam filling material and its associated corroded surfaces. In addition, metallic fillings cast a shadow that can be visible through the tooth and make it appear darker.

==== Tetracycline and tetracycline-derivatives ====
Tetracycline is a broad-spectrum antibiotic, and its derivative minocycline is common in the treatment of acne. The drug is able to chelate calcium ions and is incorporated into teeth, cartilage and bone. Ingestion during the years of tooth development causes a yellow-green discoloration of dentin, which is visible through the enamel and fluorescent under ultraviolet light. Later, the tetracycline oxidizes and the staining becomes more brown and no longer fluoresces under UV light. Other drugs derived from tetracycline such as glycylcycline share this side effect. Because tetracyclines cross the placenta, a child may have tooth staining if the drugs are administered during the mother's pregnancy.

==== Genetic disorders ====
Several genetic disorders affect tooth development (odontogenesis), and lead to abnormal tooth appearance and structure. Enamel hypoplasia and enamel hypocalcification are examples of defective enamel that potentially gives a discolored appearance to the tooth. Teeth affected in this way are also usually more susceptible to further staining acquired throughout life.

Amelogenesis imperfecta is a rare condition that affects the formation of enamel (amelogenesis). The enamel is fragile, the teeth appear yellow or brown, and surface stains build up more readily.

Dentinogenesis imperfecta is a defect of dentin formation, and the teeth may be discolored yellow-brown, deep amber or blue-grey with increased translucency. Dentinal dysplasia is another disorder of dentin.

Congenital erythropoietic porphyria (Gunther disease) is a rare congenital form of porphyria, and may be associated with red or brown discolored teeth.

Hyperbilirubinemia during the years of tooth formation may make bilirubin incorporate into the dental hard tissues, causing yellow-green or blue-green discoloration. One such condition is hemolytic disease of the newborn (erythroblastosis fetalis).

Thalassemia and sickle cell anemia may be associated with blue, green or brown tooth discoloration.

A high proportion of children with cystic fibrosis have discolored teeth. This is possibly the result of exposure to tetracycline during odontogenesis, however cystic fibrosis transmembrane regulator has also been demonstrated to be involved in enamel formation, suggesting that the disease has some influence on tooth discoloration regardless of exposure to tetracyclines.

=== Aging ===
Intrinsic discoloration tends to accompany aging. Throughout life deposition of secondary dentin occurs along the internal walls of the pulp chamber. Secondary dentin is darker and more opaque than primary dentin. This gives the dentin an overall darker appearance. At the same time, the enamel layer is gradually thinned by tooth wear processes such as attrition and acid erosion, a degree of which is considered normal. Enamel also becomes less porous and phosphate-deficient.

== Management ==
Discoloration of the front teeth is one of the most common reasons people seek dental care. However, many people with teeth of normal shade ask for them to be whitened. Management of tooth discoloration depends on the cause. Most discoloration is harmless and may or may not be of cosmetic concern to the individual. In other cases it may indicate underlying pathology such as pulp necrosis or rarely a systemic disorder.

Most extrinsic discoloration is readily removed by cleaning the teeth, whether with "whitening" (i.e., abrasive) toothpaste at home, or as treatment carried out by a professional (e.g., scaling and/or polishing). To prevent future buildup of extrinsic stains, identification of the cause (e.g., smoking) is required.

Intrinsic discoloration generally requires one of the many types of tooth bleaching. Alternatively the appearance of the tooth can be hidden with dental restorations (e.g., composite fillings, veneers, crowns).

== Teeth whitening ==
Teeth whitening is the process of lightening the color of human teeth. Whitening is often desirable when teeth yellow over time for various reasons and can be achieved by altering the internal or external color of the tooth enamel. The chemical degradation of chromogens inside or on the surface of the tooth is called bleaching.

Professional teeth whitening is performed using bleaching agents, usually hydrogen peroxide or carbamide peroxide, at concentrations significantly higher than those used in over-the-counter products. During the procedure, the dentist applies a protective gel to the gums, then applies the bleaching solution to the teeth. Hydrogen peroxide is similar to carbamide peroxide as it is released upon contact of the stable complex with water. Upon diffusion into the tooth, the peroxide acts as an oxidizer, decomposing to form unstable free radicals. In the gaps between the inorganic salts in tooth enamel, these unstable free radicals attach to molecules of organic pigments, resulting in the formation of smaller, less pigmented components. Reflecting less light, these smaller molecules create the whitening effect. Peroxy acids are an alternative to hydrogen peroxide and also contribute to breaking down pigment molecules. Various stain removal products are available on the market. Identification of the type, intensity, and location of tooth discoloration is necessary for successful treatment. The exposure time and concentration of the whitening agent affect the final result of teeth whitening.
