= Streptomyces rimosus =

Scientific classification
- Domain: Bacteria
- Kingdom: Bacillati
- Phylum: Actinomycetota
- Class: Actinomycetia
- Order: Streptomycetales
- Family: Streptomycetaceae
- Genus: Streptomyces
- Species: S. rimosus

Binomial name
- Streptomyces rimosus Sobin et al. 1953 (Approved Lists 1980)

Subspecies
- S. rimosus paromomycinus S. rimosus rimosus

Species of bacterium

Streptomyces rimosus is a bacterium species in the genus Streptomyces.

It was isolated from a soil sample in 1950 by A. C. Finlay et al., who isolated terramycin (earth fungus), later called oxytetracycline, from it.

== Uses ==
The antibiotics oxytetracycline and tetracycline are produced in cultures of S. rimosus. Paromomycin has also been isolated from cultures of S. rimosus.

== Polyketide synthesis ==
Streptomyces rimosus's oxytetracycline polyketide synthase acyl carrier protein differs from most ACPs by having a C-terminus extension.
