= Streptomyces varsoviensis =

Scientific classification
- Domain: Bacteria
- Kingdom: Bacillati
- Phylum: Actinomycetota
- Class: Actinomycetes
- Order: Streptomycetales
- Family: Streptomycetaceae
- Genus: Streptomyces
- Species: S. varsoviensis

Binomial name
- Streptomyces varsoviensis Kurylowicz and Woznicka 1967

Type strain
- 13-1, AS 4.1431, ATCC 14631, ATCC 14631 c, ATCC 14631 C, ATCC 25505, BCRC 12647, Boots 1344, CBS 357.64, CBS 647.69, CCRC 12647, CGMCC 4.1431, CUB 116, DSM 40346, DSM 40677, ETH 32679, HAMBI 1046, IFO 13093, IMET 43351, ISP 5346, JCM 4303, JCM 4523, KCC S-0303, Kurylowicz 13-1, Lanoot R-8725, LMG 19360, MTCC 1537, NBRC 13093, NCAIM B.01482, NCIB 9522, NCIMB 9522, NRRL B-3589, NRRL-ISP 5346, R-8725, RIA 1285, VKM Ac-1000

Synonyms
- Actinomyces varsoviensis

Species of bacterium

Streptomyces varsoviensis is a bacterium species from the genus of Streptomyces which has been isolated from soil. Streptomyces varsoviensis produces oxytetracycline and hygrobafilomycin.

== See also ==
- List of Streptomyces species
