= C19H17NO7 =

The molecular formula C_{19}H_{17}NO_{7} (molar mass: 371.341 g/mol, exact mass: 371.1005 u) may refer to:

- Incyclinide
- Nedocromil
