= Streptomyces speibonae =

Scientific classification
- Domain: Bacteria
- Kingdom: Bacillati
- Phylum: Actinomycetota
- Class: Actinomycetes
- Order: Streptomycetales
- Family: Streptomycetaceae
- Genus: Streptomyces
- Species: S. speibonae

Binomial name
- Streptomyces speibonae Meyers et al. 2003

Type strain
- ATCC BAA-411, BCRC 16379, CCRC 16379, CIP 108060, DSM 41797, DSN 41797, JCM 12682, KCTC 9973, NBRC 100916, NBRC 101001, NRRL B-24240, PK-Blue

Synonyms
- Streptomyces capensis

Species of bacterium

Streptomyces speibonae is a bacterium species from the genus of Streptomyces which has been isolated from soil from Cape Town in South Africa. Streptomyces speibonae produces the antibiotic oxytetracycline.

== See also ==
- List of Streptomyces species
