= Pulp canal obliteration =

Medical condition in teeth

Pulp canal obliteration (also termed pulp chamber obliteration or root canal obliteration) is a condition which can occur in teeth where hard tissue is deposited along the internal walls of the root canal and fills most of the pulp system leaving it narrowed and restricted.

The exact causes of pulp obliteration are unclear but it typically occurs in response to dental trauma, especially following luxation injuries involving displacement, particularly if a tooth is replanted after being completely avulsed (knocked out) This response is common in this scenario and typically starts to occur several months after replantation. In other cases obliteration can occur if the tooth is drilled down extensively during dental treatment, e.g. during crown preparation.

Signs and symptoms of obliteration include:

- Yellow tooth discoloration
- Lack or response to pulp sensibility test (e.g. ethyl chloride, electric pulp test)
- Lack of visible radiolucency where pulp system should be on radiographs (x-rays)

Most of the time this condition is painless and is managed conservatively by monitoring the tooth with routine radiographs. There is a small risk of pulp necrosis. If root canal treatment is attempted it can be difficult or impossible on a tooth with pulp canal obliteration.

== See also ==
- Internal resorption
