= Metacycline =

Chemical compound

Clinical data
- AHFS/Drugs.com: International Drug Names
- ATC code: J01AA05 (WHO)

Identifiers
- IUPAC name: (2Z,4S,4aR,5S,5aR,12aS)-2-[amino(hydroxy)methylene]-4-(dimethylamino)-5,10,11,12a-tetrahydroxy-6-methylene-4a,5a,6,12a-tetrahydrotetracene-1,3,12(2H,4H,5H)-trione
- CAS Number: 914-00-1
- PubChem CID: 54675785
- ChemSpider: 10468596
- UNII: IR235I7C5P
- ChEMBL: ChEMBL249837
- NIAID ChemDB: 001301
- CompTox Dashboard (EPA): DTXSID2023272
- ECHA InfoCard: 100.011.834

Chemical and physical data
- Formula: C_{22}H_{22}N_{2}O_{8}
- Molar mass: 442.424 g·mol^{−1}
- 3D model (JSmol): Interactive image
- SMILES: NC(=O)C=3C(=O)[C@@]4(O)C(\O)=C2\C(=O)c1c(O)cccc1C(=C)[C@H]2[C@H](O)[C@H]4[C@H](N(C)C)C=3O
- InChI: InChI=1S/C22H22N2O8/c1-7-8-5-4-6-9(25)11(8)16(26)12-10(7)17(27)14-15(24(2)3)18(28)13(21(23)31)20(30)22(14,32)19(12)29/h4-6,10,14-15,17,25,27-29,32H,1H2,2-3H3,(H2,23,31)/t10-,14-,15+,17+,22+/m1/s1; Key:MHIGBKBJSQVXNH-IWVLMIASSA-N

Metacycline or methacycline is a tetracycline antibiotic. It is used as a precursor in the industrial synthesis of doxycycline hyclate.

It has been found to act as an agonist of the human pregnane X receptor ligand-binding domain and to induce CYP3A4 expression in vitro.
