= Incyclinide =

Chemical compound

Clinical data
- Trade names: Metastat (proposed)
- ATC code: none

Legal status
- Legal status: Abandoned?

Identifiers
- IUPAC name: (4aS,5aR,12aS)-3,10,12,12a-Tetrahydroxy-1,11-dioxo-1,4,4a,5,5a,6,11,12a-octahydronaphthacen-2-carboxamide
- CAS Number: 15866-90-7
- PubChem CID: 54678924
- ChemSpider: 28530521
- UNII: 21G64WZQ4I
- KEGG: D04519
- ChEMBL: ChEMBL2104970

Chemical and physical data
- Formula: C_{19}H_{17}NO_{7}
- Molar mass: 371.345 g·mol^{−1}
- 3D model (JSmol): Interactive image
- SMILES: c1cc2c(c(c1)O)C(=O)C3=C([C@]4([C@@H](C[C@@H]3C2)CC(=C(C4=O)C(=O)N)O)O)O
- InChI: InChI=1S/C19H17NO7/c20-18(26)14-11(22)6-9-5-8-4-7-2-1-3-10(21)12(7)15(23)13(8)16(24)19(9,27)17(14)25/h1-3,8-9,21-22,24,27H,4-6H2,(H2,20,26)/t8-,9-,19-/m0/s1; Key:ZXFCRFYULUUSDW-OWXODZSWSA-N

Incyclinide (proposed trade name Metastat) is a chemically modified tetracycline antibiotic that was investigated in clinical trials for the treatment of rosacea, various tumours, allergic and inflammatory diseases and a number of other conditions.

Data from animal studies suggest that centrally infused incyclinide attenuates microglial mediated neuroinflammation in the paraventricular nucleus of the hypothalamus and sympathetic activation in angiotensin II-induced hypertension. This was also associated with unique changes in gut microbial communities and profound attenuation of gut pathology in animal models of hypertension.

== Mechanism of action ==
Like other tetracyclines, incyclinide inhibits matrix metalloproteinases. In contrast to traditional tetracyclines, it lacks strong antibiotic properties.
