= Narrow-spectrum antibiotic =

Antibiotic that only kills a limited number of species of bacteria

A narrow-spectrum antibiotic is an antibiotic that is only able to kill or inhibit limited species of bacteria. Examples of narrow-spectrum antibiotics include fidaxomicin and sarecycline.

== Advantages ==
- Narrow-spectrum antibiotic allow to kill or inhibit only those bacteria species that are unwanted (i.e. causing disease). As such, it leaves most of the beneficial bacteria unaffected, hence minimizing the collateral damage on the microbiota.
- Low propensity for bacterial resistance development.

== Disadvantages ==
Often, the exact species of bacteria causing the illness is unknown, in which case narrow-spectrum antibiotics can't be used, and broad-spectrum antibiotics are used instead. To know the exact species of bacteria causing the illness, clinical specimens need to be taken for antimicrobial susceptibility testing in a clinical microbiology laboratory.

== See also ==
- Antimicrobial spectrum
- Broad-spectrum antibiotics
