= Glycylcycline =

Class of antiobiotics

Glycylcyclines are a class of antibiotics derived from tetracycline. These tetracycline analogues are specifically designed to overcome two common mechanisms of tetracycline resistance, namely resistance mediated by acquired efflux pumps and/or ribosomal protection. Presently, tigecycline is the only glycylcycline approved for antibiotic use.

== History ==
The development of these agents was spurred by the increasing prevalence of bacteria resistant to tetracyclines. These agents were first synthesized in the early 1990s by making modifications to the tetracyclines. By adding a bulky N,N-dimethylglycylamido side chain to position 9 of minocycline, the compound became less susceptible to tetracycline resistance mediated by acquired efflux pumps and/or ribosomal protection. Further development of this initial work led to the creation of tigecycline, the first glycylcycline available for clinical use.

=== Approvals ===
- Tigecycline (FDA approved May 27, 2005)

== Mechanism of action ==
Glycylcycline antibiotics have a similar mechanism of action as tetracycline antibiotics. They block protein synthesis hence preventing bacterial reproduction. Both classes of antibiotics bind to the 30S ribosomal subunit to prevent the amino-acyl tRNA from binding to the A site of the ribosome. However, the glycylcyclines appear to bind more effectively than the tetracyclines.

== Mechanisms of resistance ==
While glycylcyclines have greater efficacy against organisms with tetracycline resistance mediated by acquired efflux pumps and/or ribosomal protection, glycylcyclines are not effective against organisms with chromosomal efflux pumps, such as Pseudomonas and Proteae.

== Side effects and contraindications ==
Since glycylcyclines are similar to tetracyclines, they share many of the same side effects and contraindications as tetracyclines. These side effects may include nausea/vomiting, headache, photosensitivity, discoloration of growing teeth, and fetal damage.

These antibiotics should not be given to pregnant women due to risk of fetal harm. Additionally, these drugs should not be administered during periods of tooth development because of the risk of tooth discoloration. Due to glycylcyclines' similarities with tetracyclines, hypersensitivity reactions to tetracycline antibiotics may predispose one to hypersensitivity reactions with glycylcycline antibiotics; hence, glycylcyclines should be used with caution in these patients.
