= Broad-spectrum antibiotic =

Treatment for a wide range of bacteria

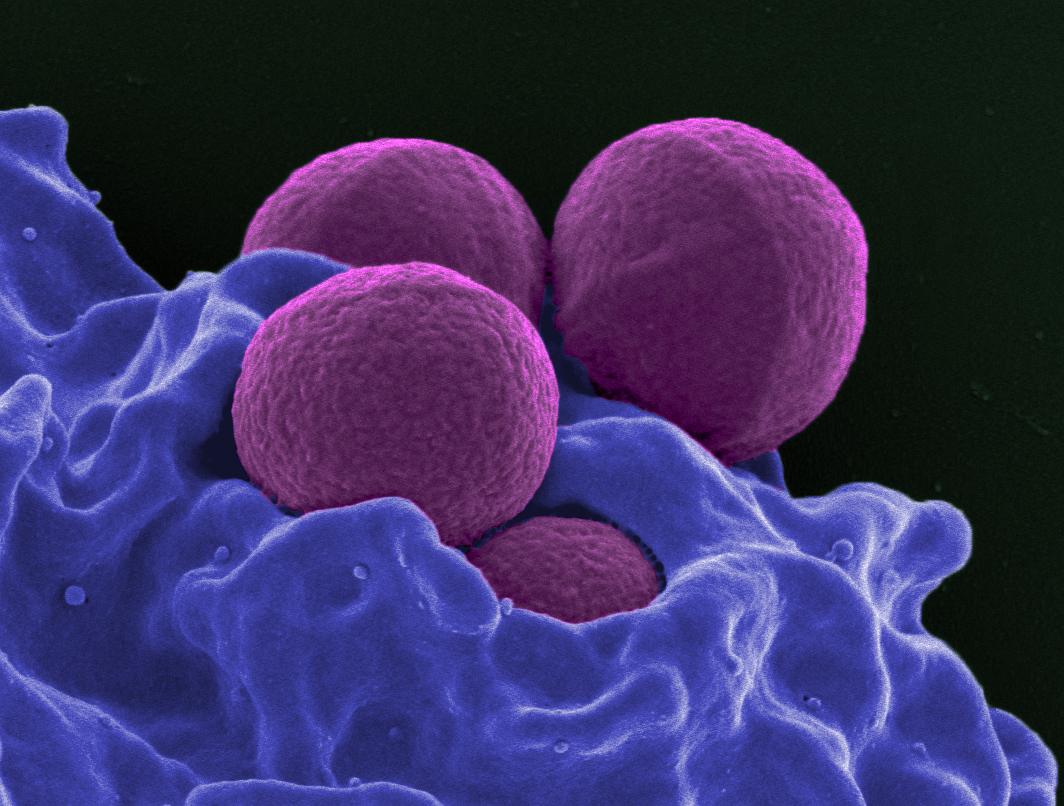
A colored electron microscopy image of methicillin-resistant staphylococcus aureus (MRSA), a bacterium commonly targeted by broad-spectrum antibiotics

A broad-spectrum antibiotic is an antibiotic that acts on the two major bacterial groups, Gram-positive and Gram-negative, or any antibiotic that acts against a wide range of disease-causing bacteria. These medications are used when a bacterial infection is suspected but the group of bacteria is unknown (also called empiric therapy) or when infection with multiple groups of bacteria is suspected. This is in contrast to a narrow-spectrum antibiotic, which is effective against only a specific group of bacteria. Although powerful, broad-spectrum antibiotics pose specific risks, particularly the disruption of native, normal bacteria and the development of antimicrobial resistance. An example of a commonly used broad-spectrum antibiotic is ampicillin.

== Bacterial targets ==
Antibiotics are often grouped by their ability to act on different bacterial groups. Although bacteria are biologically classified using taxonomy, disease-causing bacteria have historically been classified by their microscopic appearance and chemical function. The morphology of the organism may be classified as cocci, diplococci, bacilli (also known as "rods"), spiral-shaped or pleomorphic. Additional classification occurs through the organism's ability to take up the Gram stain and counter-stain; bacteria that take up the crystal violet dye stain are referred to as "gram-positive," those that take up the counterstain only are "gram-negative," and those that remain unstained are referred to as "atypical." Further classification includes their requirement for oxygen (i.e., aerobic or anaerobic), patterns of hemolysis, or other chemical properties. The most commonly encountered groupings of bacteria include gram-positive cocci, gram-negative bacilli, atypical bacteria, and anaerobic bacteria.

== Empiric antibiotic therapy ==
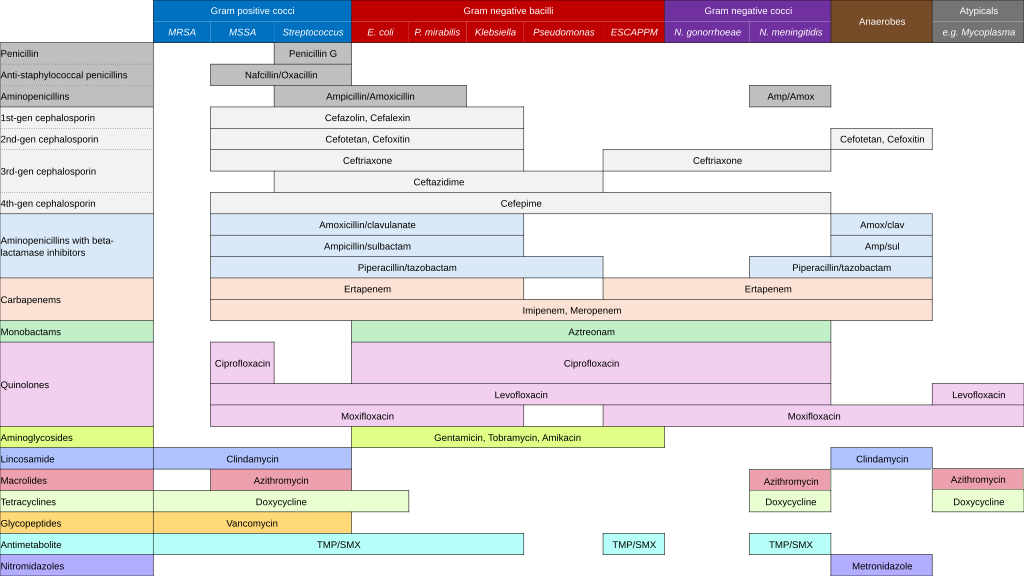
Simplified diagram showing common disease-causing bacteria and the antibiotics which act against them.

Empiric antibiotic therapy refers to the use of antibiotics to treat a suspected bacterial infection despite lack of a specific bacterial diagnosis. Definitive diagnosis of the species of bacteria often occurs through culture of blood, sputum, or urine, and can be delayed by 24 to 72 hours. Antibiotics are generally given after the culture specimen has been taken from the patient in order to preserve the bacteria in the specimen and ensure accurate diagnosis. Alternatively, some species may be identified through a urine or stool test.

== Risks ==
=== Disruption of normal microbiome ===
There are an estimated 38 trillion microorganisms that colonize the human body. As a side-effect of therapy, antibiotics can change the body's normal microbial content by attacking indiscriminately both the pathological and naturally occurring, beneficial or harmless bacteria found in the intestines, lungs and bladder. The destruction of the body's normal bacterial flora is thought to disrupt immunity, nutrition, and lead to a relative overgrowth in some bacteria or fungi. An overgrowth of drug-resistant microorganisms can lead to a secondary infection such as Clostridioides difficile ("C. diff") or candidiasis ("thrush"). This side-effect is more likely with the use of broad-spectrum antibiotics, given their greater potential to disrupt a larger variety of normal human flora. The use of doxycycline in acne vulgaris has been associated with increased risk of Crohn's disease, although a later study indicated a link between acne vulgaris and IBS irrespective of the use of antibiotics. Likewise, the use of minocycline in acne vulgaris has been associated with skin and gut dysbiosis.

== Examples of broad-spectrum antibiotics ==
Antibiotic consumption rate

In humans:

- Doxycycline
- Minocycline
- Aminoglycosides (except for streptomycin)
- Ampicillin
- Amoxicillin/clavulanic acid (Augmentin)
- Azithromycin
- Carbapenems (e.g. imipenem)
- Piperacillin/tazobactam
- Quinolones (e.g. ciprofloxacin)
- Tetracycline-class drugs (except sarecycline)
- Chloramphenicol
- Ticarcillin
- Trimethoprim/sulfamethoxazole (Bactrim)
- Ofloxacin

In veterinary medicine, co-amoxiclav, (in small animals); penicillin & streptomycin and oxytetracycline (in farm animals); penicillin and potentiated sulfonamides (in horses).
