= Sarecycline =

Antibiotic medication used to treat acne

Clinical data
- Pronunciation: sar"e sye' kleen
- Trade names: Seysara
- Other names: P-005672
- AHFS/Drugs.com: Monograph
- MedlinePlus: a618068
- License data: US DailyMed: Sarecycline
- Routes of administration: By mouth
- ATC code: J01AA14 (WHO) J01AA20 (WHO)

Legal status
- Legal status: US: ℞-only

Identifiers
- IUPAC name: (4S,4aS,5aR,12aR)-4-(dimethylamino)-1,10,11,12a-tetrahydroxy-7-{[methoxy(methyl)amino]methyl}-3,12-dioxo-4a,5,5a,6-tetrahydro-4H-tetracene-2-carboxamide
- CAS Number: 1035654-66-0
- PubChem CID: 54681908; as HCl: 71296095
- DrugBank: DB12035; as HCl: DBSALT002125
- ChemSpider: 28540486
- UNII: 94O110CX2E
- KEGG: D10666; as HCl: D10667
- ChEMBL: ChEMBL2364632
- PDB ligand: V7A (PDBe, RCSB PDB)
- CompTox Dashboard (EPA): DTXSID001027924
- ECHA InfoCard: 100.241.852

Chemical and physical data
- Formula: C_{24}H_{29}N_{3}O_{8}
- Molar mass: 487.509 g·mol^{−1}
- 3D model (JSmol): Interactive image
- SMILES: CON(C)Cc1ccc(O)c2c1C[C@H]1C[C@H]3[C@H](N(C)C)C(=O)C(C(N)=O)=C(O)[C@@]3(O)C(=O)C1=C2O
- InChI: InChI=1S/C24H29N3O8/c1-26(2)18-13-8-11-7-12-10(9-27(3)35-4)5-6-14(28)16(12)19(29)15(11)21(31)24(13,34)22(32)17(20(18)30)23(25)33/h5-6,11,13,18,28-29,32,34H,7-9H2,1-4H3,(H2,25,33)/t11-,13-,18-,24-/m0/s1; Key:AYUMVPHUMFKFPJ-SBAJWEJLSA-N

Sarecycline, sold under the brand name Seysara, is a narrow-spectrum tetracycline-derived antibiotic medication. It is specifically designed for the treatment of acne, and was approved by the FDA in October 2018 for the treatment of inflammatory lesions of non-nodular moderate to severe acne vulgaris in patients 9 years of age and older. Two randomized and well-controlled clinical trials reported efficacy data on both facial and truncal acne (back and chest). Efficacy was assessed in a total of 2002 subjects 9 years of age and older. Unlike other tetracycline-class antibiotics, sarecycline has a long C7 moiety that extends into and directly interact with the bacterial messenger RNA (mRNA) via hydrogen bonding of the oxygen atom in the N-oxide moiety to nucleotide residues. The spectrum of activity is limited to clinically relevant Gram-positive bacteria, mainly Cutibacterium acnes, with little or no activity against Gram-negative bacterial microflora commonly found in the human gastrointestinal tract.

== Medical uses ==
Sarecycline, is indicated for the treatment of inflammatory lesions of non-nodular moderate to severe acne vulgaris.

== Synthesis ==
The chemical synthesis of sarecycline was reported:

skin-invert-image

The iodination of sancycline [808-26-4] (1) with N-iodosuccinimide gave 7-iodotetracycline [113164-67-3] (2). Carbonylation catalyzed by palladium acetate and Xantphos followed by treatment with triethylsilane provided the corresponding aldehyde [1035655-10-7] (3). Reductive amination with methoxymethylamine [1117-97-1] using sodium cyanoborohydride as the reductant provided an overall yield of 23% of sarecycline (4).
