= Tetracycline =

Antibiotic

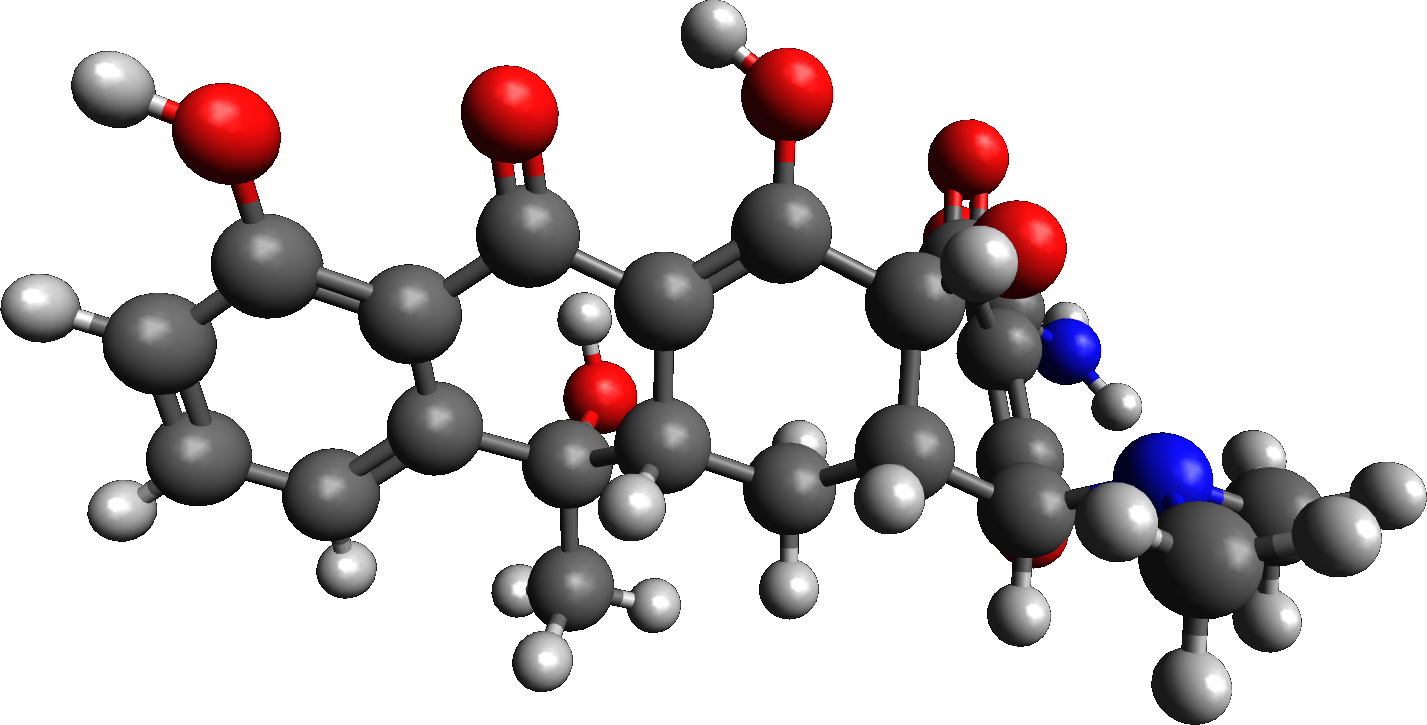

Clinical data
- Pronunciation: /ˌtɛtrəˈsaɪkliːn/
- Trade names: Tetracyn
- Other names: TE/TET/TC/TCY
- AHFS/Drugs.com: Monograph
- MedlinePlus: a682098
- License data: US DailyMed: Tetracycline
- Pregnancy category: AU: D
- Routes of administration: By mouth
- Drug class: Tetracycline antibiotic
- ATC code: A01AB13 (WHO) D06AA04 (WHO), J01AA07 (WHO), J01RA19 (WHO), S01AA09 (WHO), S02AA08 (WHO), S03AA02 (WHO), QG01AA90 (WHO), QG51AA02 (WHO), QJ51AA07 (WHO)

Legal status
- Legal status: In general: ℞ (Prescription only)

Pharmacokinetic data
- Bioavailability: 80%
- Metabolism: Not metabolized
- Elimination half-life: 8–11 hours, 57–108 hours (kidney impairment)
- Excretion: Urine (>60%), feces

Identifiers
- IUPAC name: (4S,4aS,5aS,6S,12aR)-4-(dimethylamino)-1,6,10,11,12a-pentahydroxy-6-methyl-3,12-dioxo-4,4a,5,5a-tetrahydrotetracene-2-carboxamide
- CAS Number: 60-54-8; 64-75-5
- PubChem CID: 54675776
- DrugBank: DB00759
- ChemSpider: 10257122
- UNII: F8VB5M810T
- KEGG: D00201
- ChEBI: CHEBI:27902
- ChEMBL: ChEMBL1440
- PDB ligand: TAC (PDBe, RCSB PDB)
- CompTox Dashboard (EPA): DTXSID7023645
- ECHA InfoCard: 100.000.438

Chemical and physical data
- Formula: C_{22}H_{24}N_{2}O_{8}
- Molar mass: 444.440 g·mol^{−1}
- 3D model (JSmol): Interactive image
- SMILES: C[C@]1(c2cccc(c2C(=O)C3=C([C@]4([C@@H](C[C@@H]31)[C@@H](C(=C(C4=O)C(=O)N)O)N(C)C)O)O)O)O
- InChI: InChI=1S/C22H24N2O8/c1-21(31)8-5-4-6-11(25)12(8)16(26)13-9(21)7-10-15(24(2)3)17(27)14(20(23)30)19(29)22(10,32)18(13)28/h4-6,9-10,15,25,27-28,31-32H,7H2,1-3H3,(H2,23,30)/t9-,10-,15-,21+,22-/m0/s1; Key:OFVLGDICTFRJMM-WESIUVDSSA-N

Tetracycline, sold under various brand names, is an antibiotic in the tetracyclines family of medications, used to treat a number of infections, including acne, cholera, brucellosis, plague, malaria, and syphilis. It is available in oral and topical formulations.

Common side effects include vomiting, diarrhea, rash, and loss of appetite. Other side effects include poor tooth development if used by children less than eight years of age, kidney problems, and sunburning easily. Use during pregnancy may harm the baby. It works by inhibiting protein synthesis in bacteria.

Tetracycline was patented in 1953 and was approved for prescription use in 1954. It is on the World Health Organization's List of Essential Medicines. Tetracycline is available as a generic medication. Tetracycline was originally made from bacteria of the genus Streptomyces. The tetracycline name comes from the 4 hydrocarbon rings.

== Medical uses ==
=== Spectrum of activity ===
Tetracyclines have a broad spectrum of antibiotic action. Originally, they possessed some level of bacteriostatic activity against almost all medically relevant aerobic and anaerobic bacterial genera, both Gram-positive and Gram-negative, with a few exceptions, such as Pseudomonas aeruginosa and Proteus spp., which display intrinsic resistance. However, acquired (as opposed to inherent) resistance has proliferated in many pathogenic organisms and greatly eroded the formerly vast versatility of this group of antibiotics. Resistance amongst Staphylococcus spp., Streptococcus spp., Neisseria gonorrhoeae, anaerobes, members of the Enterobacteriaceae, and several other previously sensitive organisms is now quite common. Tetracyclines remain especially useful in the management of infections by certain obligately intracellular bacterial pathogens such as Chlamydia, Mycoplasma, and Rickettsia. They are also of value in spirochaetal infections, such as syphilis, and Lyme disease. Certain rare or exotic infections, including anthrax, plague, and brucellosis, are also susceptible to tetracyclines. Tetracycline tablets were used in the plague outbreak in India in 1994. Tetracycline is first-line therapy for Rocky Mountain spotted fever (Rickettsia), Lyme disease (B. burgdorferi), Q fever (Coxiella), psittacosis, Mycoplasma pneumoniae, and nasal carriage of meningococci.

It is also one of a group of antibiotics which together may be used to treat peptic ulcers caused by bacterial infections. The mechanism of action for the antibacterial effect of tetracyclines relies on disrupting protein translation in bacteria, thereby damaging the ability of microbes to grow and repair; however, protein translation is also disrupted in eukaryotic mitochondria leading to effects that may confound experimental results.

The following list presents MIC susceptibility data for some medically significant microorganisms:

- Escherichia coli: 1 μg/mL to >128 μg/mL
- Shigella spp.: 1 μg/mL to 128 μg/mL

=== Anti-eukaryote use ===
The tetracyclines also have activity against certain eukaryotic parasites, including those responsible for diseases such as dysentery caused by an amoeba, malaria (a plasmodium), and balantidiasis (a ciliate).

=== Use as a biomarker ===
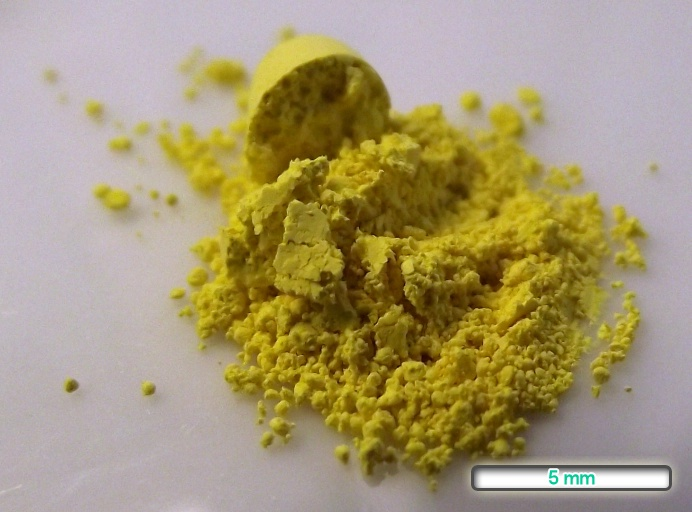
Tetracycline hydrochloride is available as yellow crystalline powder.

Since tetracycline is absorbed into bone, it is used as a marker of bone growth for biopsies in humans. Tetracycline labeling is used to determine the amount of bone growth within a certain period of time, usually a period around 21 days. Tetracycline is incorporated into mineralizing bone and can be detected by its fluorescence. In "double tetracycline labeling", a second dose is given 11–14 days after the first dose, and the amount of bone formed during that interval can be calculated by measuring the distance between the two fluorescent labels.

Tetracycline is also used as a biomarker in wildlife to detect consumption of medicine- or vaccine-containing baits.

== Side effects ==
Use of tetracycline antibiotics can:

- Discolor permanent teeth (yellow-gray-brown), from prenatal period through childhood and adulthood. Children receiving long- or short-term therapy with a tetracycline or glycylcycline may develop permanent brown discoloration of the teeth.
- Be inactivated by calcium ions, so are not to be taken with milk, yogurt, and other dairy products
- Be inactivated by aluminium, iron, and zinc ions, so are not to be taken at the same time as indigestion remedies (some common antacids and over-the-counter heartburn medicines)
- Cause skin photosensitivity, so exposure to the sun or intense light is not recommended
- Cause drug-induced lupus and hepatitis
- Cause microvesicular fatty liver
- Cause tinnitus
- Cause epigastric pain
- Interfere with methotrexate by displacing it from the various protein-binding sites
- Cause breathing complications, as well as anaphylactic shock, in some individuals
- Affect bone growth of the fetus; however, this has not been shown to cause birth defects.
- Induce Fanconi syndrome, which may occur after ingesting expired tetracyclines.

Caution should be exercised in long-term use when breastfeeding. Short-term use is safe; bioavailability in milk is low to nil. According to the U.S. Food and Drug Administration (FDA), cases of Stevens–Johnson syndrome, toxic epidermal necrolysis, and erythema multiforme associated with doxycycline use have been reported, but a causative role has not been established.

== Pharmacology ==
=== Mechanism of action ===
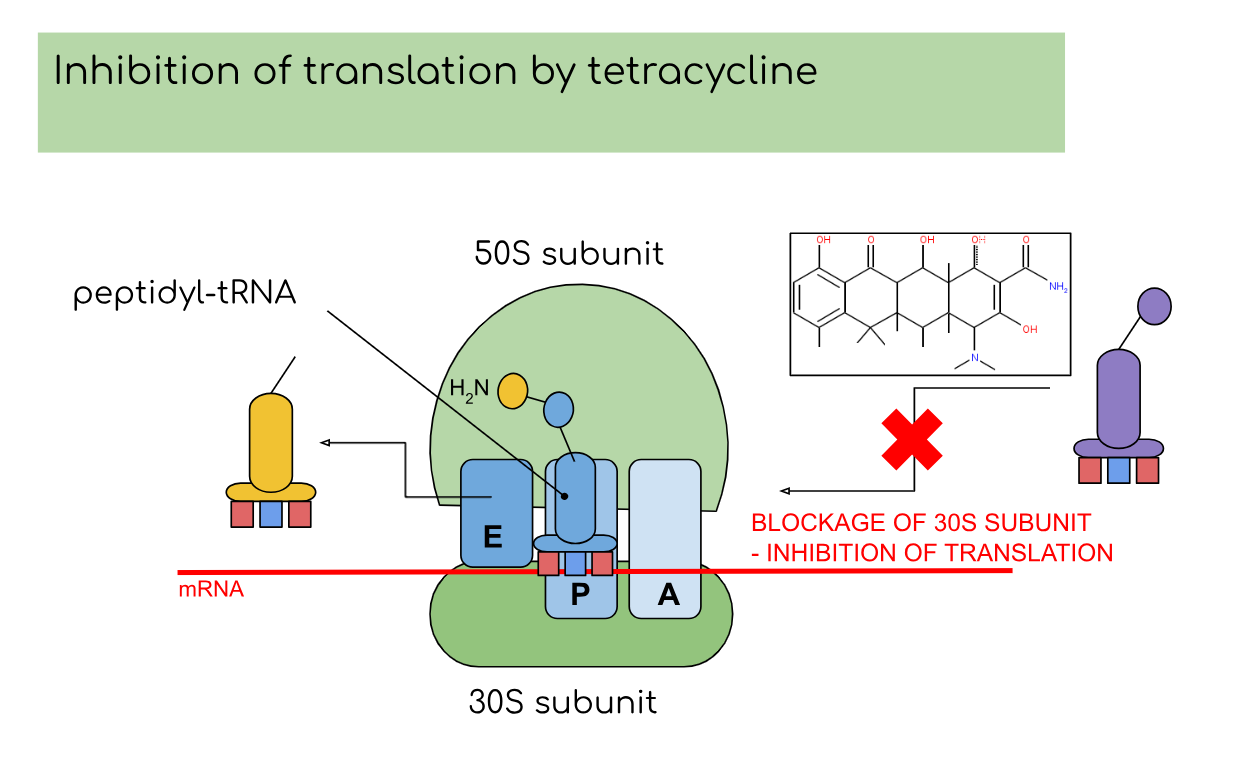
Tetracycline inhibits the process of protein synthesis because it prevents aminoacyl tRNA (purple) from binding to the A site of the 30S subunit.

Tetracycline inhibits protein synthesis by blocking the attachment of charged tRNA at the P site of the ribosome. Tetracycline blocks the A-site so that a hydrogen bond is not formed between the amino acids. Tetracycline binds to the 30S and 50S subunit of microbial ribosomes; It thus prevents the formation of a peptide chain. The action is usually not inhibitory and irreversible even with the withdrawal of the drug. Mammalian cells are not vulnerable to the effect of tetracycline, as these cells contain no 30S ribosomal subunits, and so do not accumulate the drug. This accounts for the relatively small off-site effect of tetracycline on human cells.

=== Mechanisms of resistance ===
Bacteria usually acquire resistance to tetracycline from horizontal transfer of a gene that either encodes an efflux pump or a ribosomal protection protein. Efflux pumps actively eject tetracycline from the cell, preventing the build up of an inhibitory concentration of tetracycline in the cytoplasm. Ribosomal protection proteins interact with the ribosome and dislodge tetracycline from the ribosome, allowing for translation to continue.

== History ==
=== Discovery ===
The tetracyclines, a large family of antibiotics, were discovered by Benjamin Minge Duggar in 1948 as natural products, and first prescribed in 1948. Benjamin Duggar, working under Yellapragada Subbarow at Lederle Laboratories, discovered the first tetracycline antibiotic, chlortetracycline (Aureomycin), in 1945. The structure of Aureomycin was elucidated in 1952 and published in 1954 by the Pfizer-Woodward group. After the discovery of the structure, researchers at Pfizer began chemically modifying aureomycin by treating it with hydrogen in the presence of a palladized carbon catalyst. This chemical reaction replaced a chlorine moiety with a hydrogen, creating a compound that was named tetracycline via hydrogenolysis. Tetracycline displayed higher potency, better solubility, and more favorable pharmacology than the other antibiotics in its class, leading to its FDA approval in 1954. The new compound was one of the first commercially successful semi-synthetic antibiotics that was used, and laid the foundation for the development of Sancycline, Minocycline, and later the Glycylcyclines.

=== Evidence in antiquity ===
Tetracycline has a high affinity for calcium and is incorporated into bones during the active mineralization of hydroxyapatite. When incorporated into bones, tetracycline can be identified using ultraviolet light.

There is evidence that early inhabitants of Northeastern Africa consumed tetracycline antibiotics. Nubian mummies from between 350 and 550 A.D. were found to exhibit patterns of fluorescence identical with that of modern tetracycline labelled bone. It is conjectured that the beer brewed by the Nubians was the source of the tetracycline found in these bones.

== Society and culture ==
=== Economics ===
According to data from EvaluatePharma and published in the Boston Globe, in the USA the price of tetracycline rose from $0.06 per 250-mg pill in 2013 to $4.06 a pill in 2015. The Globe described the "big price hikes of some generic drugs" as a "relatively new phenomenon" which has left most pharmacists "grappling" with large upswings" in the "costs of generics, with 'overnight' price changes sometimes exceeding 1,000%."

=== Brand names ===
It is marketed under the brand names Sumycin, Tetracyn, and Panmycin, among others. Actisite is a thread-like fiber formulation used in dental applications.

It is also used to produce several semisynthetic derivatives, which together are known as the tetracycline antibiotics. The term "tetracycline" is also used to denote the four-ring system of this compound; "tetracyclines" are related substances that contain the same four-ring system.

=== Media ===
Due to the drug's association with fighting infections, it serves as the main "commodity" in the science fiction series Aftermath, with the search for tetracycline becoming a major preoccupation in later episodes.

Tetracycline is also represented in Bohemia Interactive's survival sandbox, DayZ. In the game, players may find the antibiotic to treat the common cold, influenza, cholera and infected wounds, but does not portray any side effects associated with tetracycline.

== Research ==
=== Genetic engineering ===
In genetic engineering, tetracycline is used in transcriptional activation. It has been used as an engineered "control switch" in chronic myelogenous leukemia models in mice. Engineers were able to develop a retrovirus that induced a particular type of leukemia in mice, and could then "switch" the cancer on and off through tetracycline administration. This could be used to grow the cancer in mice and then halt it at a particular stage to allow for further experimentation or study.

A technique being developed for the control of the mosquito species Aedes aegypti (the infection vector for yellow fever, dengue fever, Zika fever, and several other diseases) uses a strain that is genetically modified to require tetracycline to develop beyond the larval stage. Modified males raised in a laboratory develop normally as they are supplied with this chemical and can be released into the wild. Their subsequent offspring inherit this trait, but find no tetracycline in their environments, so never develop into adults.
