= Excoriated acne =

- Other names: Picker's acne or Acné excoriée des jeunes filles
- Specialty: Dermatology

Excoriated acne, also called acne excoriée or picker's acne, is a type of skin picking disorder characterized by the repetitive, compulsive urge to pick, scratch, or squeeze one's pimples. This can ultimately lead to physical changes to the skin, such as scarring, and/or further emotional distress.

== Epidemiology ==
In the United States, the prevalence of all skin picking disorders is between 1.4% and 5.4%, and it is the most common psychocutaneous disorder in adults and children. However, the exact prevalence for excoriated acne, that is picking at acne spots specifically, is unknown. Excoriated acne makes up an estimated 1.5% of all dermatology visits. There is a 3:1 ratio of women to men, and this condition commonly starts between 15–45 years of age, with people in their early 20s the most affected age group. Excoriated acne can occur in anyone with acne, but usually people with this disorder have mild acne. Only about 30-45% of people who seek treatment and only 19% get dermatological treatment for it. Excoriated acne is an underdiagnosed and undertreated condition because many people are uncomfortable talking about their skin picking habits or do not know they do it. Additionally, healthcare providers, especially in primary care settings, do not know about it and do not screen for it.

== Pathophysiology ==
Skin picking disorders, also known as excoriation disorders, are considered a form of obsessive–compulsive disorder and may be associated with psychiatric conditions or stress coping mechanisms. Excoriated acne is different from other types of excoriation disorders, in that picking is focused on areas of acne spots; in excoriation disorder, people may pick at any part of the skin, even healthy normal skin. Excoriated acne is also different from other types of skin picking disorders in that the person is more likely to admit to causing the irritated spots. Triggers for excoriated acne may be stress, negative feelings, or boredom.

Acne occurs when the hair follicles get clogged with oils, dead skin cells, and bacteria, leading to inflammation. People often physically manipulate their pimples in an effort to get rid of them. Sensations of tingling, itching, or pain can also make people want to pick their pimples. After picking at the pimple, swelling and inflammation may occur at the site and the pimple may turn into an open sore. People with this condition may also pick at the scabs that form after the pimple was manipulated.

== Presentation and symptoms ==
Acne can range from papules and pustules to large cysts. People with excoriated acne can have pimples present but some people who constantly pick might not have any visible pimples. They might only have open sores, scratches, or scars where they picked. Using tools such as tweezers can increase the amount of skin damage and scarring. When acne lesions are picked, they can take much longer to heal, up to months. Excoriated acne lesions are most common on the face, where acne commonly occurs and one's hands can easily access and pick, scratch, or squeeze pimples. Acne also often occurs on the back and when people pick at the pimples on the back that are accessible to the hands, it can form what is known as the "butterfly sign," which excludes areas of the back that are more difficult to reach.

People with excoriated acne have the urge to pick their pimples and are unable to resist this impulse. After manipulating the pimple, they often feel guilty or relieved after the impulsive act is completed.

When the skin is irritated and inflamed, changes in skin color, such as hyperpigmentation or hypopigmentation can occur, and people with excoriated acne can develop these discolored, darker or lighter spots where their pimple previously was. People with darker skin color who have excoriated acne are more likely to have hyperpigmentation that is more frequent and more severe.

== Diagnosis ==
Due to an increase in the prevalence of skin picking disorders, of which excoriated acne is a subtype, excoriation disorder was added to the DSM-5 in 2013 and the ICD-11 manuals, with the former providing diagnostic criteria. There is no official diagnostic criteria for excoriated acne specifically. There are several scales to measure the severity of skin picking disorders, such as the Skin Picking Scale and Skin Picking Impact Scale.

Excoriated acne is a clinical diagnosis. A physical exam of the acne spots, open lesions from picking, and healed scars from picking is important to the diagnosis of excoriated acne. Non-healing acne, extensive scarring, and scarring with an unusual shape may be a red flag for excoriated acne. Other diagnoses such as prurigo, which involves generalized itching, should be ruled out. The addition of a mental examination and history-taking is enough to make the diagnosis of excoriated acne. People may have mental health issues such as anxiety, depression, body dysmorphic disorder, and social phobia at the same time, and these possible comorbid diagnoses should be explored.

== Prognosis ==
If the skin picking is not brought on by an acute stressor, the prognosis is generally poor. Skin picking disorders are often chronic, coming and going in one's life. Excoriated acne can lead to significant scarring, discoloration, and consequences such as low self-esteem, anxiety, and reductions in quality of life. Embarrassment and being a victim of bullying may occur, which can lead to development of additional psychological consequences and social withdrawal.

== Treatment ==
Hydrocolloid patches might help the pimple resolve while also providing a physical barrier to prevent the person from picking. Wearing gloves or finding an alternative activity to keep the hands busy may be helpful when the urge to pick the skin arises. It is important for the person to understand that picking can cause more scarring than the actual acne itself.

Some healthcare providers may recommend treatments to lessen the scarring and discoloration from excoriated acne. For example, treatment of discoloration includes topical hydroquinone, azelaic acid, and kojic acid. Laser therapies can be used to minimize the appearance of scars from picking. However, this does not address the original cause and cycle of new acne, picking the acne, and resulting discoloration and scarring. Appropriate treatments for active acne, taking into account the type and severity of the acne, should be given. Acne treatments may include retinoids and antibiotics, which may be topical for mild lesions, and oral for more severe acne. Oral contraceptives may also be used.

Addressing the underlying cause, such as a specific stressor, and cycle of picking is the main treatment for excoriated acne. Referral to a mental health specialist may be necessary when this condition interferes with daily living or is a major source of distress. Psychotherapies including cognitive behavioral therapy and habit reversal training have been effective in reducing the severity of skin picking disorders.

Because excoriated acne may be caused by or considered an obsessive compulsive disorder, treatments for obsessive compulsive disorder may help. Severe cases of skin picking disorders that do not respond to non-pharmacological interventions may be prescribed a selective serotonin reuptake inhibitor, a medication effective for obsessive compulsive disorder. N-acetylcysteine is an oral medication that has been effective in reducing the urge of skin picking disorders. It may be less effective for people who are automatically picking or unaware of their picking.

== See also ==
- List of cutaneous conditions
