= Extraction =

Extraction may refer to:

== Science and technology ==
=== Biology and medicine ===
- Comedo extraction, a method of acne treatment
- Dental extraction, the surgical removal of a tooth from the mouth

=== Computing and information science ===
- Data extraction, the process of retrieving data from data sources
- Information extraction
- Knowledge extraction
- The process of reversing data compression, a.k.a. decompression
- The process of choosing elements from a source document, in linguistics

=== Other uses in science and technology ===
- Extraction (chemistry), the separation of a substance from a matrix
  - Fragrance extraction, the process of obtaining fragrant oils and compounds from raw materials
  - Liquid–liquid extraction
- Primary extraction, the act of removing a spent cartridge from the chamber of a firearm
- Resource extraction, the process of locating, acquiring and selling any resource
  - Petroleum extraction, the process of recovering petroleum from the ground
- Root extraction, in mathematics, the computation of a nth root

== Arts and entertainment ==
- Extraction (2015 film), an American thriller film starring Kellan Lutz, Bruce Willis, and Gina Carano
- Extraction (2020 film), an American action film starring Chris Hemsworth
- Extraction (album), by guitarist Greg Howe
- Extraction (EP), by Natasha Hamilton
- "Extraction" (The Shield), an episode of the television series
- "Extraction" (Star Wars: The Bad Batch)
- "Extractions", a song by BS 2000 on the 2001 album Simply Mortified
- Dead Space: Extraction, a video game prequel to the 2008 game Dead Space
- Dirty Bomb (video game), formerly known as Extraction
- Tom Clancy's Rainbow Six Extraction, 2022 video game

== Other uses ==
- Ancestry or origin of a person
- Extraction (military), the removal of someone from a hostile area to an area occupied by either friendly personnel or within friendly control
- Literary extract, in which a portion of a written work is published
- A part of a rowing stroke

== See also ==
- Extract
- Extracted (disambiguation)
