= Hyperkeratinization =

Disorder of the cells lining the inside of a hair follicle

- Other names: Hyperkeratinisation
- Specialty: Dermatology

Hyperkeratinization (American English or hyperkeratinisation in British) is a disorder of the cells lining the inside of a hair follicle. It is the normal function of these cells to detach or slough off (desquamate) from the skin lining at normal intervals. The dead cells are then forced out of the follicle (primarily by the growing hair). However, in hyperkeratinization, this process is interrupted and a number of these dead skin cells do not leave the follicle because of an excess of keratin, a natural protein found in the skin. This excess of keratin results in an increased adherence of dead skin cells. This cohesion of cells will block or "cap" the hair follicle (leading to keratosis pilaris) or clog the sebaceous/oil duct (leading to acne). Pathogens may also play a role in causing, perpetuating, or simply taking advantage of this phenomenon, such as virulent sub-strains of Cutibacterium acnes and irregular migration of Staphylococcus epidermidis from the outer surface of the skin into the follicle, where commensal strains of C. acnes exclusively habitate. It itches mildly at times, and strongly at others. Very often it cannot be felt at all.

== See also ==
- Hyperkeratosis
