= Extracted =

Extracted may refer to:

- Extracted (film), a 2012 American science fiction thriller
- Extracted (TV series), a 2025 American reality series

== See also ==
- Extract
- Extraction (disambiguation)
