= Postinflammatory hyperpigmentation =

Skin condition

- Specialty: Dermatology

Postinflammatory hyperpigmentation (PIH) is a skin condition characterized by the darkening of the skin (hyperpigmentation) following an inflammatory injury, such as acne, dermatitis, infectious disease, or trauma. Less frequently, it may occur as a complication of a medical procedure performed on the skin. It is a common cause of skin discoloration and can affect individuals of all skin types.

== Symptoms and signs ==
PIH manifests as areas of increased pigmentation or darkened skin. The color can range from light brown to deep brown or grey to black. Individuals with darker skin typically develop lesions that are darker and last longer compared to people with lighter skin color. Without any treatment, PIH usually fades in the 6-12 months following its appearance, until it is no longer visible.

Postinflammatory hyperpigmentation (PIH) and postinflammatory erythema (PIE) are related but biologically different outcomes of skin inflammation. PIH happens because cytokines stimulate melanocytes, leading to more melanin production and brown or gray discoloration. This is especially common in people with darker skin types. In contrast, PIE shows up as persistent red or pink spots caused by superficial blood vessel dilation rather than pigment deposition, and it is more often seen in people with lighter skin types. Although both may occur after acne or other types of inflammation, PIH usually responds well to treatments that target pigment, while PIE is better treated with methods that focus on blood vessels, like pulsed-dye laser.

== Causes ==
Postinflammatory hyperpigmentation develops after the original symptoms of an inflammatory skin condition disappear. Common triggers include acne lesions, cuts, burns, or skin conditions like eczema. Additionally, UV sun exposure and sunburn are involved in the development, darkening, and expansion of hyperpigmented skin lesions. Some medical procedures performed on the skin can cause an inflammatory reaction, which may lead to hyperpigmentation, even if the inflammation itself is temporary.

The exact pathogenesis of PIH is poorly understood. It is known to be driven by cytokine-mediated paracrine interactions between keratinocytes and melanocytes, eventually stimulating the melanocytes to dramatically increase production of melanin, which then deposits in the skin.

== Prevention ==
Hyperpigmentation can generally be prevented by inhibition of melanogenesis, with agents such as 4-Butylresorcinol, while the wound is healing. Notice that such agents might interfere with wound healing.

== Diagnosis ==
A diagnosis of postinflammatory hyperpigmentation is established based upon its clinical presentation coupled with a recent history of inflammation over the same area. Diagnostic tests are not required, but can rule out some other conditions, such as Addison's disease or systemic lupus erythematosus. Wood’s lamp evaluation can be used in the diagnosis as well.

== Treatment ==
Treatment for postinflammatory hyperpigmentation may include topical agents like hydroquinone, retinoids, ascorbic acid, and azelaic acid, as well as chemical peels or laser therapy to promote skin renewal and reduce pigmentation. Sun protection is also crucial to prevent further darkening of the affected skin. In severe or recurrent cases, combination therapy of hydroquinone plus one or more additional topical agents is common.

Topical medications and other non-procedural treatments are preferred over chemical peels, laser therapy, dermabrasion, and other "destructive therapies". This is because the topical treatments are often very effective in managing PIH and typically cost less, while also having lower potential for side effects or worsening of the condition. Some patients (especially those with darker skin) have been known to experience worsening of their PIH with destructive therapy, rather than improvement. The reason for this is often not known.

== See also ==
- Hyperpigmentation
- Melanin
