= Keratosis pilaris =

Skin condition characterized by small bumps caused by overproduction of keratin

- Other names: Follicular keratosis, lichen pilaris
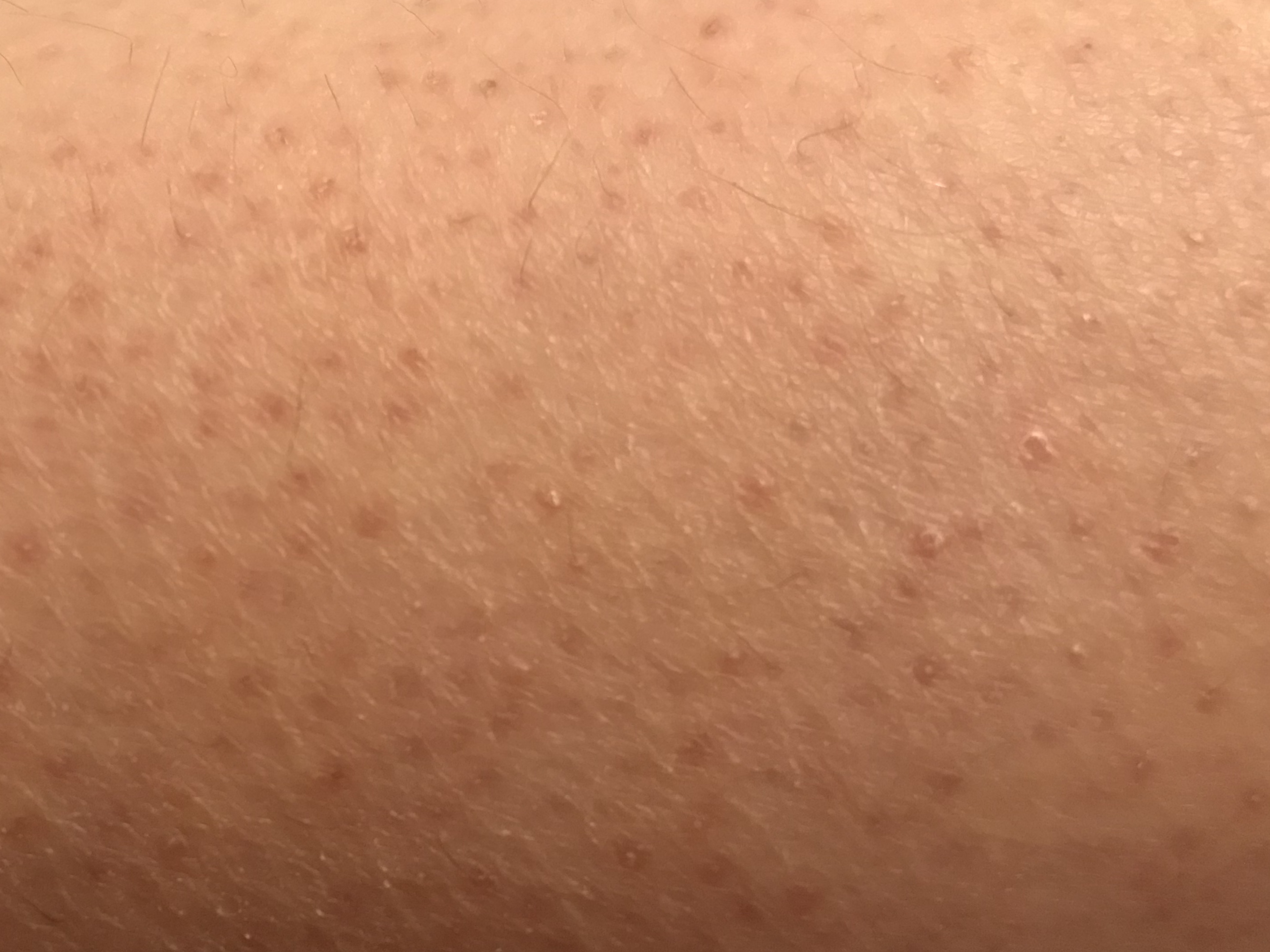
- Condition on a calf
- Specialty: Dermatology

Keratosis pilaris (KP; also follicular keratosis, lichen pilaris, or colloquially chicken skin) is a common, autosomal-dominant, genetic condition of the skin's hair follicles characterized by the appearance of possibly itchy, small, gooseflesh-like bumps, with varying degrees of reddening or inflammation. It most often appears on the outer sides of the upper arms (the forearms can also be affected), thighs, face, back, and buttocks; KP can also occur on the hands, and tops of legs, sides, or any body part except glabrous (hairless) skin (like the palms or soles of feet). Often the lesions can appear on the face, which may be mistaken for acne or folliculitis.

The several types of KP have been associated with pregnancy, type 1 diabetes mellitus, obesity, dry skin, allergic diseases (e.g., atopic dermatitis), and rarely cancer. Many rarer types of the disorder are part of inherited genetic syndromes.

The cause of KP is not completely understood. As of 2018, KP is thought to be due to abnormalities in the deposition of the protein keratin in hair follicles, in the hair shaft, or in both. KP is usually diagnosed by a medical professional based on the appearance of the skin, but dermoscopy can be used, as well, if the diagnosis is unclear. Variants of the ABCA12 gene have been associated with KP.

KP is the most common disorder of the hair follicle in children. How common it is in adults is unclear, as keratosis pilaris is underreported, and the actual prevalence may be higher than estimated. No single approach has been found to cure KP completely, but treatments can improve the cosmetic appearance of the condition. Treatment includes the application of topical preparations of moisturizers and medications such as glycolic acid, lactic acid, salicylic acid, urea, or retinoids to the skin. Fractional carbon dioxide lasers and Nd:YAG laser therapies are also effective.

== Signs and symptoms ==
KP results in small, rough bumps on the skin's surface. They are skin-colored bumps the size of a grain of sand, many of which are slightly pink in light-skinned people and dark spots in dark-skinned people. Most people with KP do not have symptoms, but the bumps in the skin can occasionally be itchy. Irritation due to scratching KP bumps can result in redness and inflammation.

Though people with KP experience the condition year-round, the problem can flare up, with the bumps likely to look and feel more pronounced in color and texture, during the colder months, when moisture levels in the air are lower. The symptoms may also worsen during pregnancy or after childbirth. Increased sun exposure might mitigate the symptoms of KP.

== Pathophysiology ==
KP occurs when the human body produces excess amounts of the skin protein keratin, resulting in the formation of small, raised bumps in the skin, often with surrounding redness. The excess keratin, which is the same color as the person's natural skin tone, surrounds and entraps the hair follicles in the pore. This causes the formation of hard plugs (a process known as hyperkeratinization). Many KP bumps contain an ingrown hair that has coiled. This is a result of the keratinized skin's "capping off" the hair follicle, preventing the hair from exiting. The hair grows encapsulated inside the follicle. KP is more common in patients with atopic diseases such as allergic rhinitis and atopic dermatitis.

KP subtypes are occasionally part of genetically inherited syndromes associated with intellectual disability, neuro-cardio-facial-cutaneous syndromes, RASopathies, ectodermal dysplasias, and certain myopathies.

== Diagnosis ==
Physicians can often diagnose KP simply by examining the skin without specialized tests, but a dermatologist can use dermoscopy to confirm the diagnosis and assess if a person with KP is responding to treatment. Physicians often consider family history and the presence of symptoms when making the diagnosis. Those with this condition are generally encouraged to contact a physician if the bumps are bothersome and do not improve with over-the-counter lotions.

=== Differential diagnosis ===
Several medications that can cause a skin eruption similar to KP include cyclosporine, BRAF inhibitors, and tyrosine kinase inhibitors.

=== Classification ===
The several different types of KP include KP rubra (red, inflamed bumps, which can be on arms, head, legs), KP alba (rough, bumpy skin with no irritation), KP rubra faceii (reddish rash on the cheeks), KP atrophicans, keratosis follicularis spinulosa decalvans, atrophoderma vermiculatum, KP atrophicans faciei, erythromelanosis follicularis faciei et colli, and papular profuse precocious KP.

KP is commonly described in association with other dry-skin conditions, such as ichthyosis vulgaris, dry skin, and atopic dermatitis, including those of asthma and allergies. KP does not bear any known, long-term health implications, nor is it associated with increased mortality or morbidity. It is not related to goose bumps, which result from muscle contractions, except that both occur in the area where the hair shaft exits the skin.

== Gallery ==
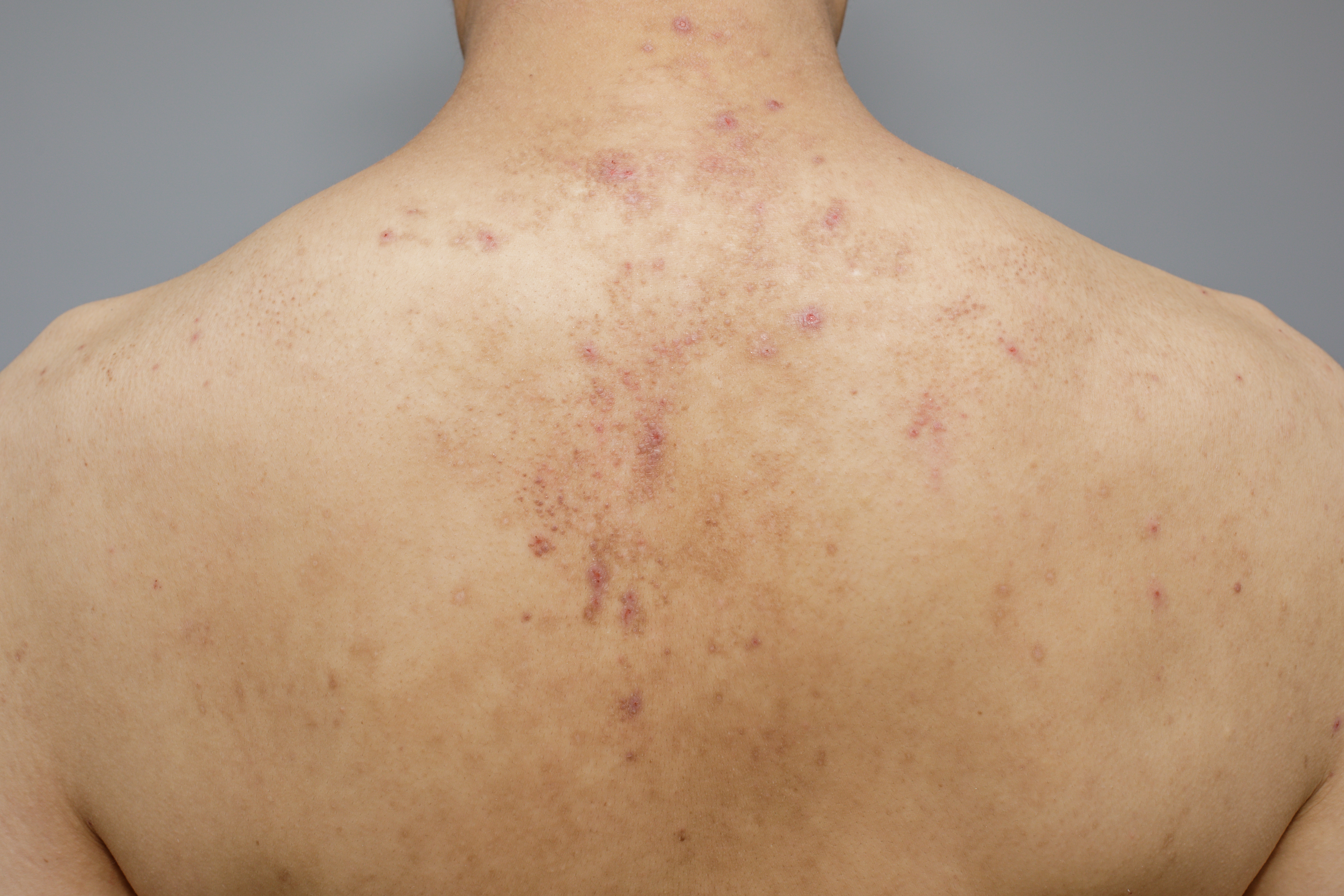
Keratosis Pilaris on Back

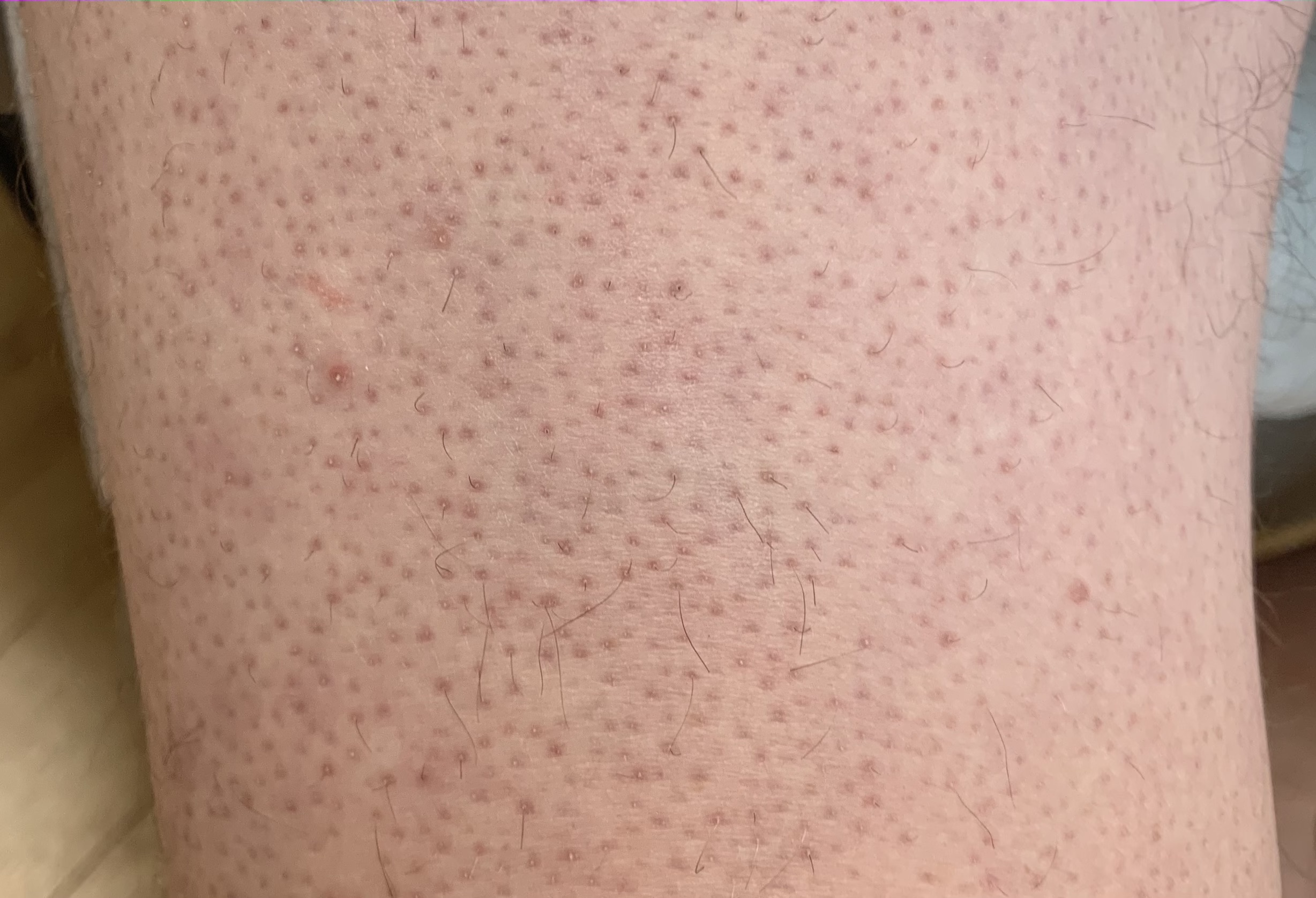
Keratosis pilaris on lower extremity

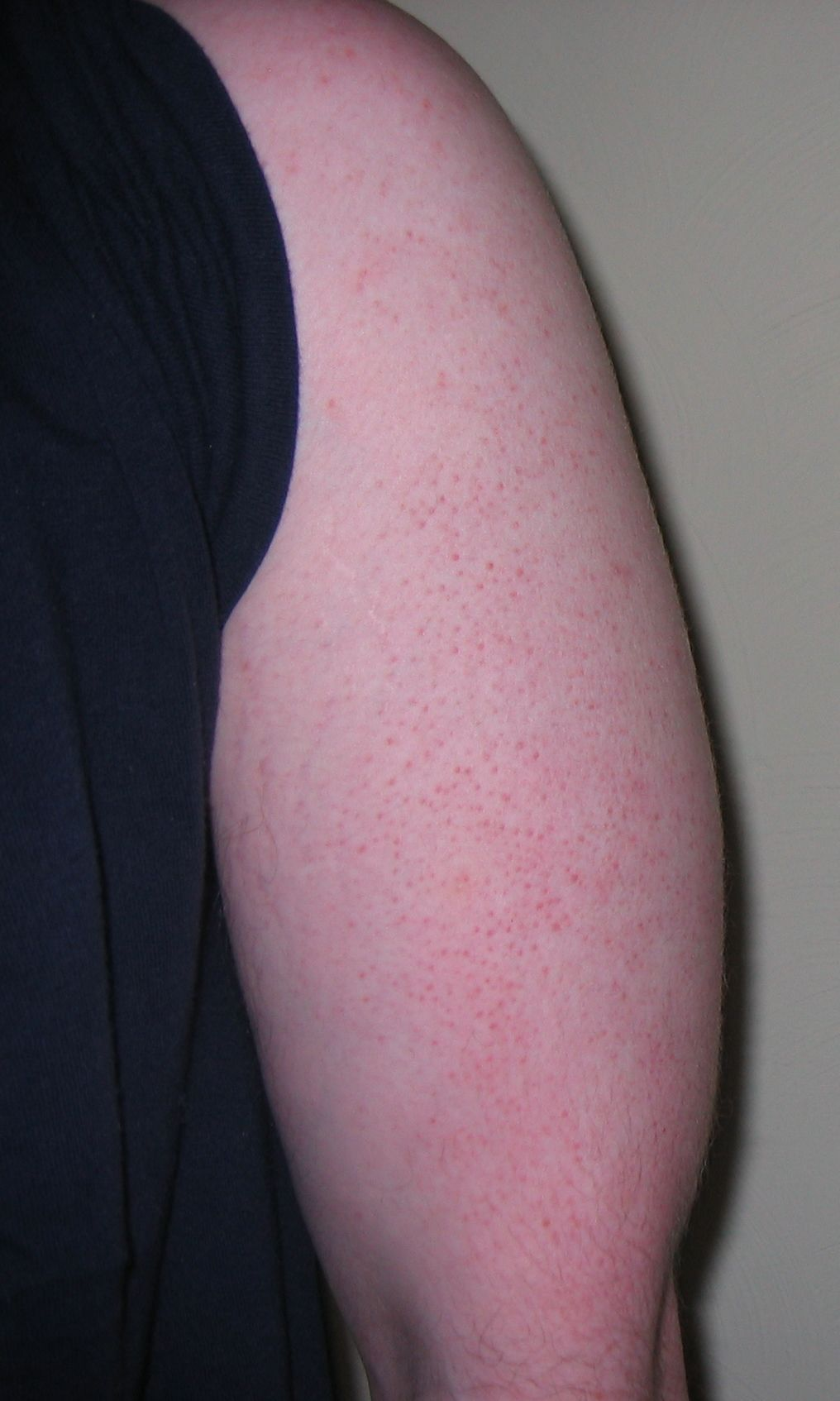
Keratosis pilaris on the back of the upper arm

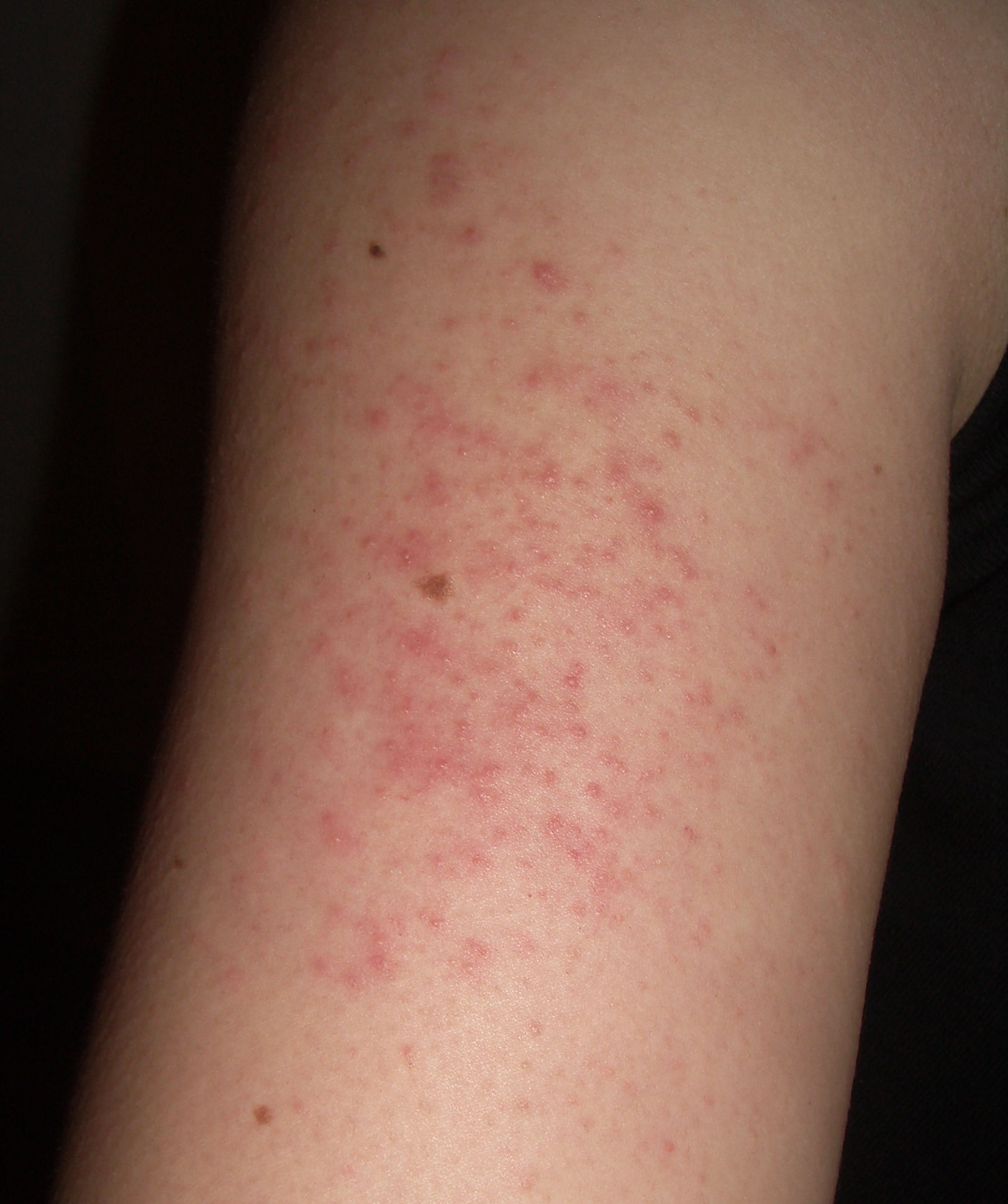
Keratosis pilaris on arm

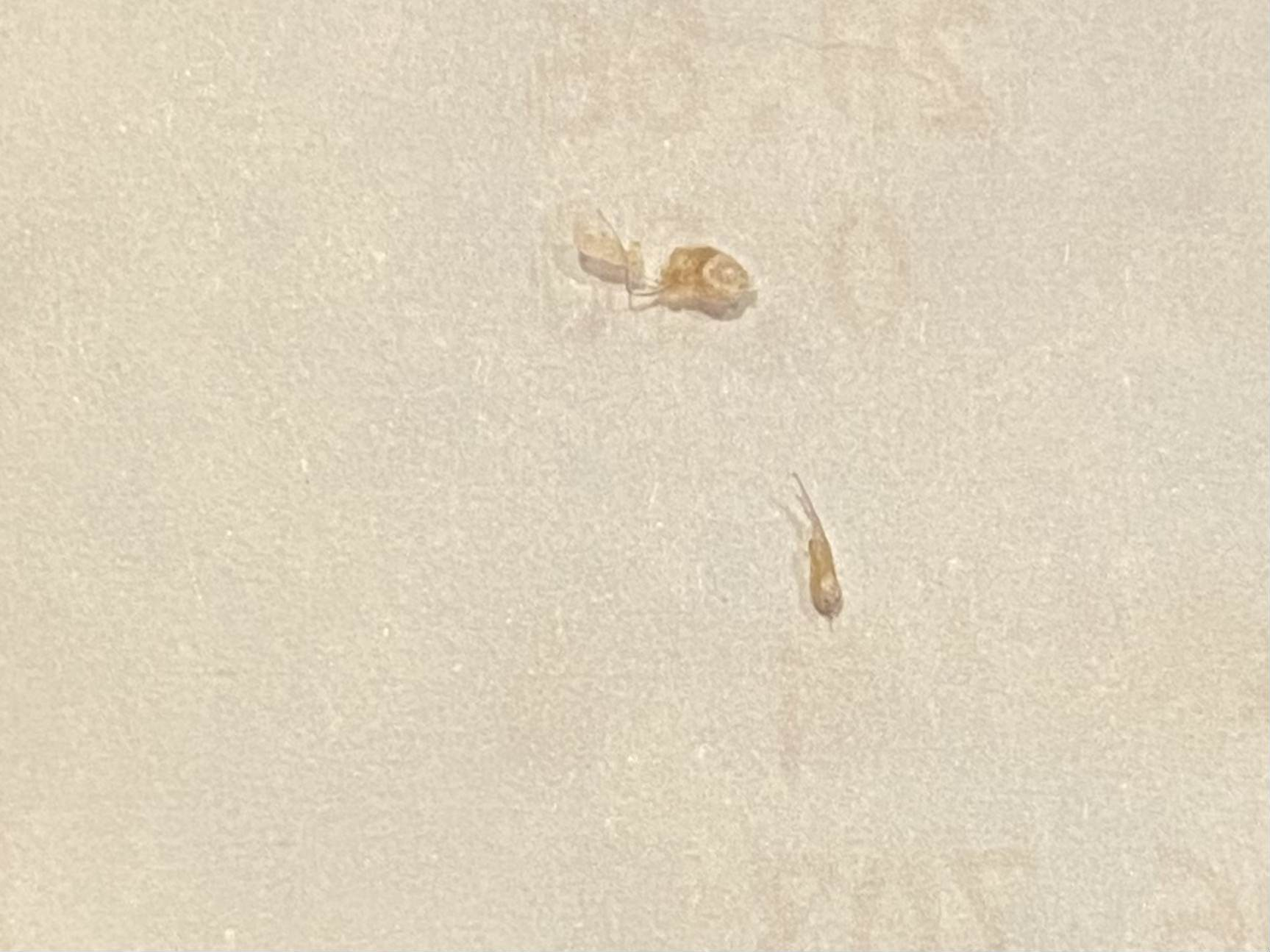
Skin plugs removed from a person with keratosis pilaris

== Treatment ==
Topical creams and lotions are currently the most commonly used treatment for KP, specifically those consisting of moisturizing or keratolytic treatments, including urea, lactic acid, glycolic acid, salicylic acid, vitamin D, fish oil, or topical retinoids such as tretinoin. Improvement of the skin often takes months, and the bumps are likely to return. Limiting shower duration and using gentle exfoliation to unclog pores can help. Many products are available that apply abrasive materials, with alpha or beta hydroxy acids to assist with exfoliation.

Some cases of KP have been successfully treated with laser therapy, which involves passing intense bursts of light into targeted areas of the skin. Depending on the body's response to the treatment, multiple sessions over the course of a few months may be necessary.

== Epidemiology ==
Worldwide, KP affects an estimated 30 to 50% of the adult population, and around 50 to 80% of all adolescents. It is more common in women than in men. It is often present in otherwise healthy individuals. The skin condition is prevalent in people of all ethnicities, and no particular ethnicity is at higher risk for developing KP. Although KP may manifest in people of any age, it usually appears within the first decade of life and is more common in young children. In most cases, the condition gradually improves before age 30, but it can persist longer.

== See also ==
- Ichthyosis linearis circumflexa
