= Acne aestivalis =

Actinic Folliculitis
- Other names: Acne aestivalis Mallorca acne
- Specialty: Dermatology

Actinic folluculitis (also known as Acne aestivalis or Mallorca acne) is a seasonal skin condition and a type of polymorphous light eruption caused by ultraviolet A (UVA) radiation. It is characterised by uniform red papules that typically appear between 24 and 72 hours after sun exposure, most commonly on the shoulders, upper arms, chest, and back. This condition was first seen in both men and women aged 20-40 years in Mallorca following sun exposure after the winter season.

== Signs and symptoms ==
Patients present with numerous small papules that are dull red, dome-shaped, hard, and usually 2–4 mm in diameter. These lesions typically affect the lateral upper arms, shoulder girdle, back, and chest. The face is typically not affected. The papules appear 24-72 hours after sun exposure and may last for several weeks. Comedones are not present in this type of skin reaction.

== Cause and pathophysiology ==
The condition is triggered by exposure to UVA. The exact pathophysiology of actinic follucilitis is not well understood.

It is suggested that a genetic predisposition may be a contributory factor due to a lower expression of apoptosis-inducing genes, leading to inflammation triggered by circulating ultraviolet-damaged cells that fail to undergo apoptosis and the cell fragments they release.

It is also speculated that cosmetics and sunscreen containing hydroxyl peroxides may contribute to this condition through phototoxic reactions caused by free radical release during ultraviolet-induced oxidation.

== Diagnosis, treatment, and prognosis ==
Diagnosis is based on clinical examination of skin lesions and a history of recent sun exposure. A diagnosis is made when the patient reports the onset of papules occurring 24-72 hours after sun exposure.

Treatment for this condition typically involves topical tretinoin or benzoyl peroxide. The use of topical steroids should be avoided. There is currently no systemic treatment for acne aestivalis. The papules do not typically result in scarring.

== Epidemiology ==
There is limited information on the epidemiology of this condition. It affects men and women equally between the ages of 20 and 40, typically with no prior history of acne vulgaris. It is a seasonal skin condition, most common in spring and summer when there is greater sun exposure compared to autumn and winter.

== History ==
Actinic folliculitis was first described in 1972 by Niels Hjorth and colleagues by the name of Acne aestivalis or Mallorca acne. In this original study, the primary lesions were described as hard, dome-shaped papules 1-3mm in size, pale or pink with a narrow red halo. Of their sample, 37 out of 40 cases were women, and only 2 of which had a past history of acne vulgaris, the symptoms for which resolved after 3-6 months. The study also found the condition was the result of hyperkeratosis of the hair follicle due to stenosis of the follicular orifice.

In 1985, dermatologist Cees Nieboer proposed the term actinic superficial folluculitis to describe a similar sunlight-induced dermatosis that he had believed had not been previously described.

In 2005, Emma Veysey and Sheru George presented a case of a 29-year-old woman with actinic folliculitis that appeared 4-6 hours after exposure to sunlight. They propose that actinic folliculitis, actinic superficial folliculitis, Acne aestivalis, and Mellorca acne shared the same clinical and histopathological findings, and were likely the same condition.

== Research ==
In 2001, a study was conducted to test a prophylaxis regimen containing alpha-glucosylrutin, a strong plant-derived antioxidant. The focus of the experiment was to evaluate the effects of alpha-glucosylrutin on polymorphous light eruption and acinitic folliculitis development. The study demonstrated that applying alpha-glucosylrutin along with SPF 15 sunscreen decreases severe polymorphous light eruption cases from 96.2% to 7.4%. The study included 20 people with polymorphous light eruption and three people with acinitic folliculitis. In this study, two out of the three people with acne aestivalis did not have an episode of lesions after being prophylactically treated with alpha-glucosylrutin and SPF 15.
