= Acne with facial edema =

- Other names: Acne with facial oedema, solid facial edema
- Specialty: Dermatology

Acne with facial edema occurs uncommonly, and is associated with a peculiar inflammatory edema of the mid-third of the face. The exact cause of edema in relation to acne is unknown. Treatment includes facial stockings as well as a combination of prednisone and isotretinoin.

== Causes ==
Because acne lesions are typically moderate to severe but not severe, this phenomenon can't be explained by simple edema caused by inflammation. Chronic inflammation, similar to other body regions such as the legs, has been linked to lymphatic system damage and fibrosis, which is aided by mast cells.

== Treatment ==
Edema can be reduced by wearing elastic facial stockings for several months. Oral prednisone alone did not improve facial edema, whereas a combination with isotretinoin did. Surgical intervention after failure of conventional treatment, as described in one case, resulted in complete resolution.

== See also ==
- List of cutaneous conditions
