= Comedo extraction =

Treatment method for acne vulgaris

- Specialty: Dermatology

Comedo extraction is a widely used method of treatment for acne vulgaris. A dermatologist or cosmetologist may extract blackheads (open comedones) using gentle pressure around the pore opening, and whiteheads (closed comedones) by incision with a large needle or a blade.

If performed skillfully, this treatment may be beneficial to the patient. Possible negative effects of the procedure include incomplete extraction, refilling, scarring and tissue damage. There are few articles describing the use of comedo extraction in peer-reviewed dermatology journals. In one study in 1964 of extraction of non-inflamed whiteheads on patients' foreheads (the only study of the procedure cited in a 2007 literature review), the procedure reduced the number of future inflamed lesions and the recurrence rate of comedones, but worsened patients' inflamed cystic lesions.
