= Occupational acne =

- Specialty: Dermatology

Occupational acne is caused by several different groups of industrial compounds, including coal tar derivatives, insoluble cutting oils, and chlorinated hydrocarbons (chlornaphthalenes, chlordiphenyls, and chlordiphenyloxides).

== See also ==
- List of cutaneous conditions
