= Azelaic acid =

Organic chemical compound

Clinical data
- MedlinePlus: a603020
- License data: US DailyMed: Azelaic acid

Identifiers
- CompTox Dashboard (EPA): DTXSID8021640
- ECHA InfoCard: 100.004.246

Azelaic acid
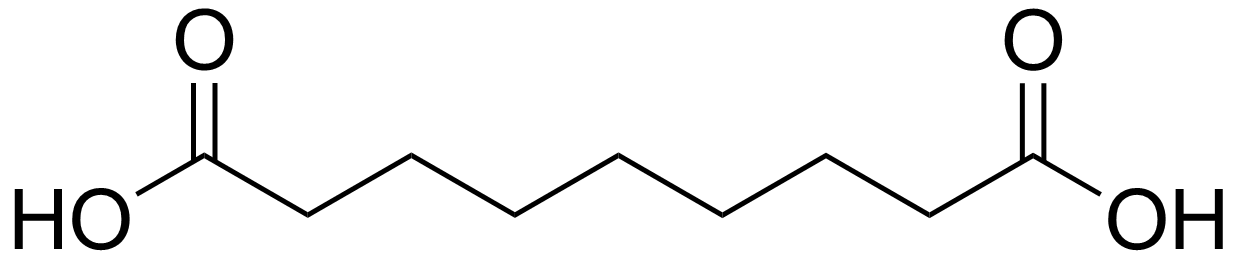

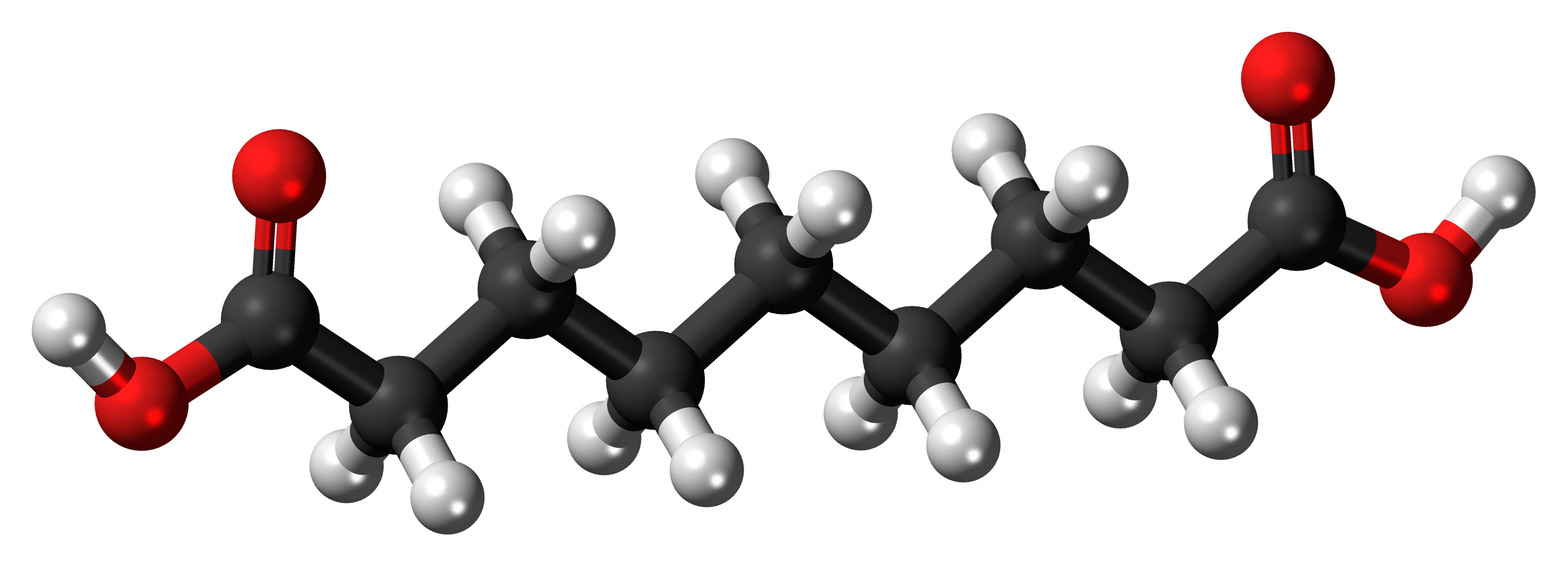

Names
- Preferred IUPAC name Nonanedioic acid
- Other names Azelate

Identifiers
CAS Number	123-99-9
3D model (JSmol)	Interactive image
Beilstein Reference	1101094
ChEBI	CHEBI:48131
ChEMBL	ChEMBL1238
ChemSpider	2179
DrugBank	DB00548
ECHA InfoCard	100.004.246
EC Number	204-669-1
Gmelin Reference	261342
IUPHAR/BPS	7484
KEGG	D03034
PubChem CID	2266
UNII	F2VW3D43YT
CompTox Dashboard (EPA)	DTXSID8021640
- InChI: InChI=1S/C9H16O4/c10-8(11)6-4-2-1-3-5-7-9(12)13/h1-7H2,(H,10,11)(H,12,13) Key: BDJRBEYXGGNYIS-UHFFFAOYSA-N; InChI=1/C9H16O4/c10-8(11)6-4-2-1-3-5-7-9(12)13/h1-7H2,(H,10,11)(H,12,13) Key: BDJRBEYXGGNYIS-UHFFFAOYAK
- SMILES: O=C(O)CCCCCCCC(=O)O

Properties
Chemical formula	C_{9}H_{16}O_{4}
Molar mass	188.223 g·mol^{−1}
Appearance	white solid
Density	1.443 g/mL
Melting point	109 to 111 °C (228 to 232 °F; 382 to 384 K)
Boiling point	286 °C (547 °F; 559 K) at 100 mmHg
Solubility in water	2.14 g/L
Acidity (pK_{a})	4.550, 5.498

Pharmacology
ATC code	D10AX03 (WHO)
Routes of administration	Topical
- Pharmacokinetics
Bioavailability	Very low
Biological half-life	12 h
Legal status	AU: S5 (Caution) / Schedule 4, Schedule 2 Appendix E, clause 3 Appendix F, clause 4; US: ℞-only

Hazards
- GHS labelling
Pictograms	(GHS07: Exclamation mark)
Signal word	Warning
Hazard statements	H315, H319
Precautionary statements	P264, P280, P302+P352, P305+P351+P338, P321, P332+P313, P337+P313, P362
- Except where otherwise noted, data are given for materials in their standard state (at 25 °C [77 °F], 100 kPa). verify (what is ?) Infobox references

Azelaic acid (AzA), or nonanedioic acid, is an organic compound with the formula HO_{2}C(CH_{2})_{7}CO_{2}H. This saturated dicarboxylic acid exists as a white powder. It is found in wheat, rye, and barley. It is a precursor to diverse industrial products including polymers and plasticizers, as well as being a component of several hair and skin conditioners. In medicine, topical formulations of AzA are used in the treatment of acne vulgaris, where they exert antimicrobial and keratolytic effects that reduce clogged hair follicles and inflammation. In plants, AzA functions as a mobile signaling molecule that primes systemic acquired resistance against pathogens by inducing the accumulation of salicylic acid. AzA also inhibits tyrosinase.

== Production ==
Azelaic acid is industrially produced by the ozonolysis of oleic acid. The side product is nonanoic acid. It is produced naturally by Malassezia furfur (also known as Pityrosporum ovale), a yeast that lives on normal skin. The bacterial degradation of nonanoic acid gives azelaic acid.

== Biological function ==
=== Plants biology ===
In plants, azelaic acid (AzA) functions as an endogenous signaling molecule that plays a central role in systemic defense responses after infection. It acts as a "distress flare," produced primarily in response to biotic stress such as pathogen attack, and is transported from infected tissues to distant parts of the plant. There, it primes systemic acquired resistance (SAR) against a broad spectrum of pathogens by inducing the accumulation of salicylic acid, a key component of the plant's immune response. Mechanistically, AzA works in concert with other mobile signals, including glycerol-3-phosphate and specific lipid transfer proteins, to orchestrate a systemic defense network that enhances disease resistance and enables rapid defensive responses to subsequent infections.

=== Human biology ===
Azelaic acid treats acne through a multifaceted mechanism that includes antibacterial, anti-keratinizing, and anti-inflammatory activities, as well as direct effects on skin microflora. It exerts bacteriostatic action against Propionibacterium acnes and Staphylococcus epidermidis by disrupting microbial cellular metabolism and membrane pH balance, resulting in reduced bacterial proliferation without promoting resistance. In keratinocytes, azelaic acid inhibits DNA, RNA, and protein synthesis, thus normalizing follicular keratinization, which helps prevent the formation of comedones—clogged hair follicles that can develop into acne lesions and are considered a hallmark of the disease. Additionally, its anti-inflammatory properties decrease the production of reactive oxygen species and pro-inflammatory cytokines, collectively reducing both visible inflammation and the severity of acne lesions.

== Applications ==
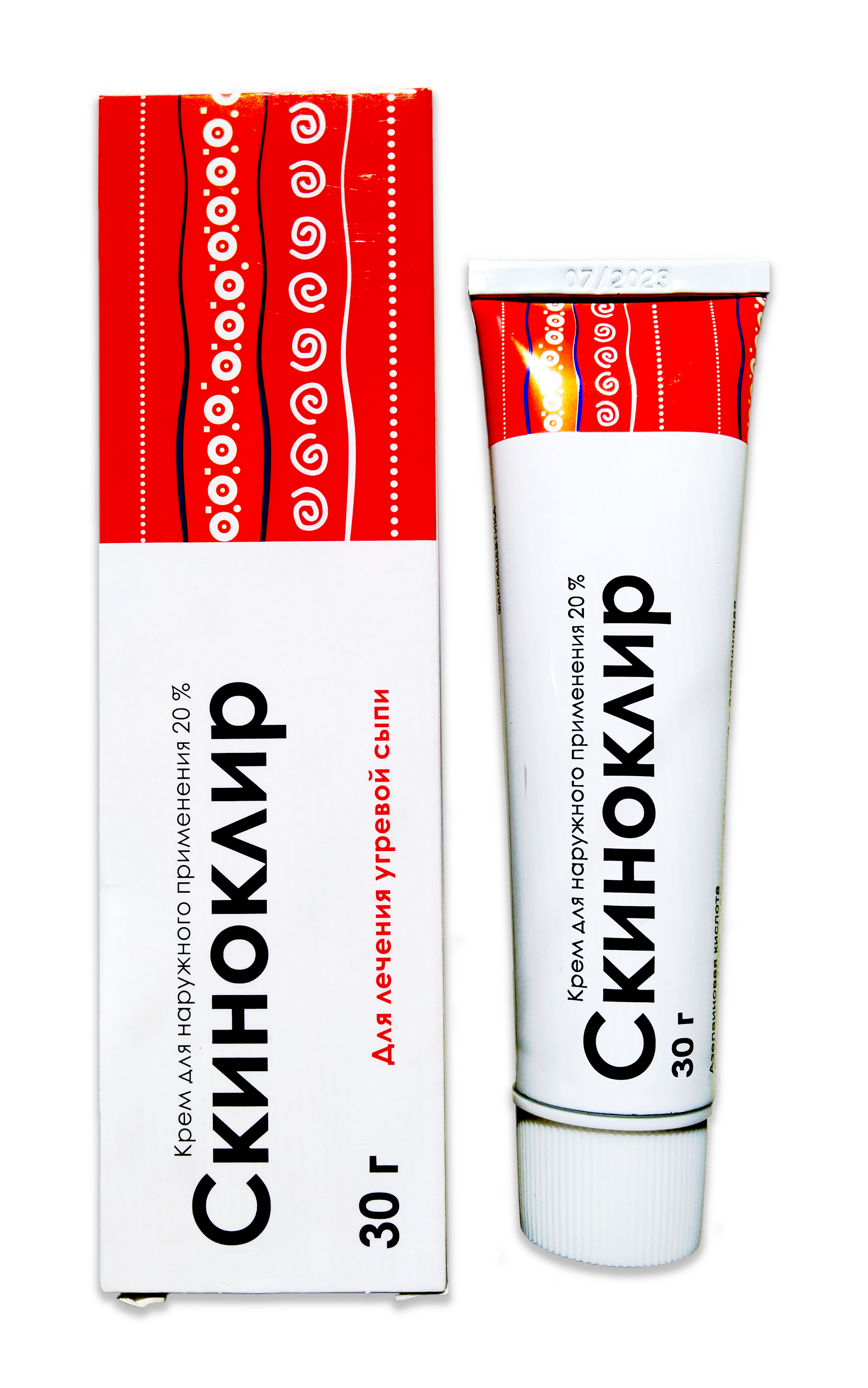
Azelaic acid cream labeled in Russian

=== Polymers and related materials ===
Esters of this dicarboxylic acid are used as lubricants and plasticizers. In the lubricant industry, it is used as a thickening agent in lithium complex grease. With hexamethylenediamine, azelaic acid forms nylon-6,9, which finds specialized uses as a plastic.

=== Medical ===
In 2023, it ranked 309th among the most commonly prescribed medications in the United States, with more than 200,000 prescriptions.

Azelaic acid is used to treat mild to moderate acne, both comedonal and inflammatory. It belongs to a class of chemicals called dicarboxylic acids. It also fights against a variety of microorganisms, such as the bacterium Propionibacterium acnes which leads to acne. It works by killing acne bacteria that infect skin pores. It also decreases the production of keratin, which is a natural substance that promotes the growth of acneic bacteria. Azelaic acid is also used as a topical gel treatment for rosacea, due to its ability to reduce inflammation. It clears the bumps and swelling caused by rosacea.

In topical pharmaceutical preparations and scientific research, AzA is typically used at concentrations of 15%–20%, but some studies show that, in certain vehicle formulations, the pharmaceutical effects of 10% AzA can be fully comparable to those of 20% creams.

==== Acne treatment ====
Azelaic acid is effective for mild to moderate acne when applied topically at 15%–20%. In patients with moderate acne, twice daily application over 3 months of 20% AzA significantly reduced the number of comedones, papules, and pustules; at this strength, it is considered to be as effective as benzoyl peroxide 5%, tretinoin 0.05%, erythromycin 2%, and oral tetracycline at 500 mg–1000 mg. In a comparative review of effects of topical AzA, salicylic acid, nicotinamide, sulfur, zinc, and alpha hydroxy acid, AzA had more high-quality evidence of effectiveness than the rest. Results can be expected after 4 weeks of twice-daily treatment. The effectiveness of long-term use is unclear, but it is recommended that AzA be used continuously for at least 6 months for maintenance.

=== Side effects ===
Potential side effects of topical AzA include skin dryness and irritation, especially in some people with eczema.

=== Whitening agent ===
Azelaic acid is used to treat skin pigmentation, including melasma and post-inflammatory hyperpigmentation, particularly in patients with darker skin types. It has been recommended as an alternative to hydroquinone. As a tyrosinase inhibitor, AzA reduces synthesis of melanin. According to one report in 1988, azelaic acid in combination with zinc sulfate in vitro was found to be a potent (90% inhibition) 5α-reductase inhibitor, similar to the hair loss drugs finasteride and dutasteride. In vitro research during the mid-1980s evaluating AzA's depigmenting (whitening) capability concluded it is effective (cytotoxic to melanocytes) at only high concentrations.

A 1996 review claimed 20% AzA is as potent as 4% hydroquinone after a period of application of three months without the latter's adverse effects and even more effective if applied along with tretinoin for the same period of time.

== Brand names ==
Brand names for azelaic acid include Dermaz 99, Crema Pella Perfetta (micronized azelaic acid, kojic dipalmitate, and liquorice extract), Azepur99, Azetec99, Azaclear (azelaic acid and niacinamide), AzClear Action, Azelex, White Action cream, Finacea, Finevin, Melazepam, Skinoren, Ezanic, Azelac, Azelan, Azaderm, (Acnegen, Eziderm, Acnicam, Azelexin in Pakistan)
