= Venereology =

Branch of medicine dealing with the study and treatment of sexually transmitted diseases

Venereologist
Occupation
- Names: Physician
- Occupation type: Specialty
- Activity sectors: Medicine

Description
- Education required: Doctor of Medicine (M.D.); Doctor of Osteopathic medicine (D.O.); Bachelor of Medicine, Bachelor of Surgery (M.B.B.S.); Bachelor of Medicine, Bachelor of Surgery (MBChB)
- Fields of employment: Hospitals, Clinics

Venereology is a branch of medicine that is concerned with the study and treatment of sexually transmitted diseases (STDs). The name derives from Roman goddess Venus, associated with love, beauty and fertility. A physician specializing in venereology is called a venereologist. In many areas of the world, the specialty is usually combined with dermatology.

The venereal diseases include bacterial, viral, fungal, and parasitic infections. Some of the important diseases are HIV infection, syphilis, gonorrhea, chlamydia, candidiasis, herpes simplex, human papillomavirus infection, and genital scabies. Other sexually transmitted infections studied in the field include chancroid, lymphogranuloma venereum, granuloma inguinale, hepatitis B, and cytomegalovirus infection.

In India, formal training of venereologists started in 1910, prompting microscopy and serology to come into general use throughout the Empire. Before this, many cases of early syphilis were either diagnosed as chancroid or missed altogether. To come to a diagnosis, doubtful atypical cases were at times left untreated to see whether they developed secondary syphilis.

== Five classical venereal diseases ==
In the early part of the twentieth century, the medical science of venereology encompassed only the five classical venereal diseases: gonorrhea, syphilis, chancroid, lymphogranuloma venereum, and granuloma inguinale (donovanosis). The history of virology shows that, in the first decade of the 20th century, viruses were not well understood.

In the early 1960s there were approximately six STDs described in textbooks and very little research was happening in sexually transmitted infections. In fact, there were not many medical centers where clinical care was offered for patients with STDs, who were left with few resources.
