= Charles Donovan =

Irish parasitologist (1863–1951)

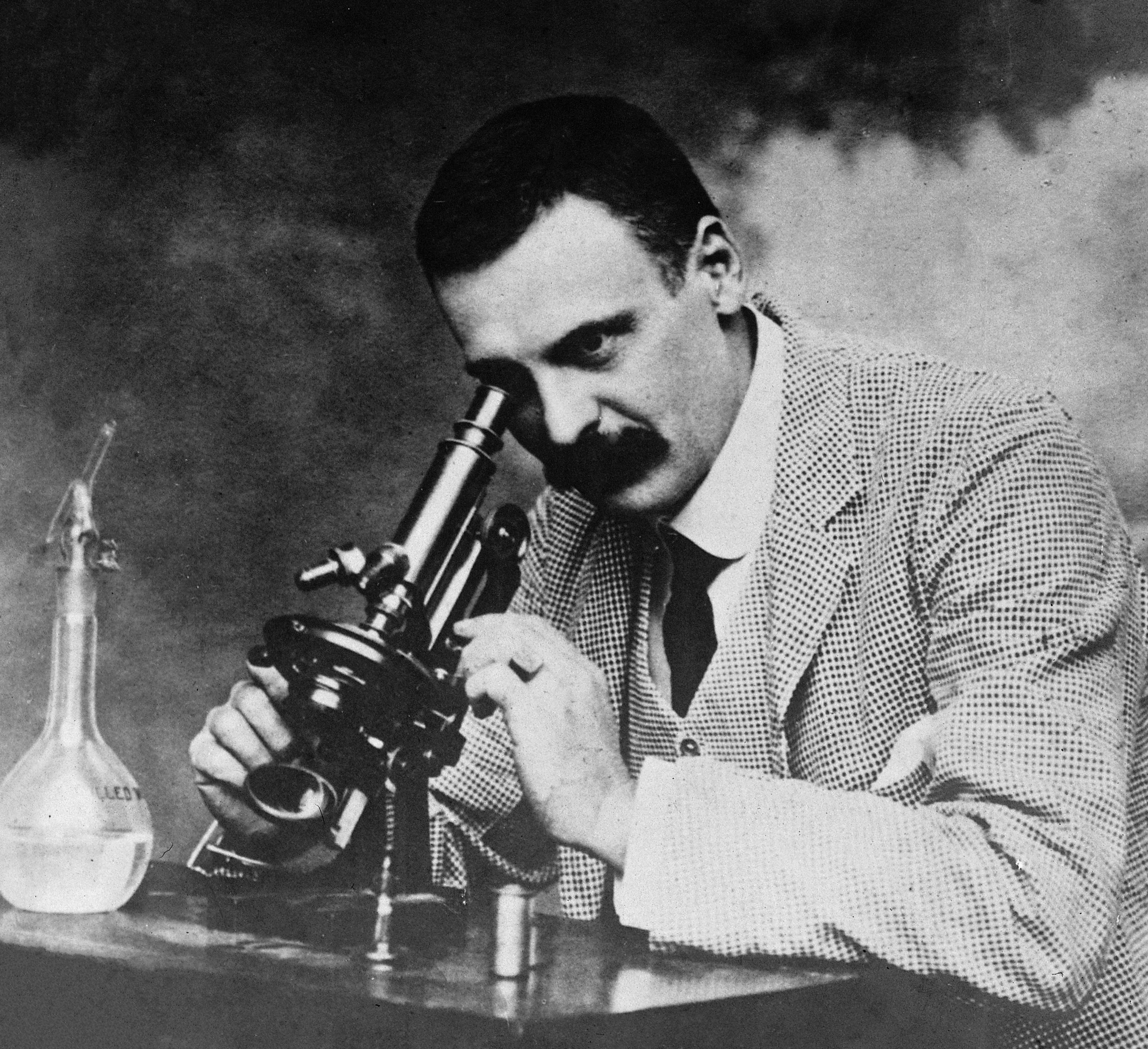
- Born: 19 September 1863; Calcutta, Bengal, British India
- Died: 29 October 1951 (aged 88); Bourton-on-the-Water, Gloucestershire, England, UK
- Citizenship: British
- Education: Trinity College Dublin (BA); Queen's College, Cork (MB BCh BAO)
- Known for: Discovery of Leishmania donovani Donovanosis
- Spouse: Mary Wren Donovan (m. 1891; died 1940)
- Children: 3
- Scientific career
- Fields: Medicine; Parasitology; Entomology
- Workplaces: Government General Hospital, Chennai; Madras Medical College; Government Royapettah Hospital
- Notable students: A.L. Mudaliar

Lieutenant Colonel Charles Donovan (19 September 1863 – 29 October 1951) was an Irish physician, parasitologist and entomologist who served as a medical officer in the Indian Medical Service. He is best remembered for his discoveries of Leishmania donovani as the causative agent of visceral leishmaniasis, and Klebsiella granulomatis as that of donovanosis. The son of a judge in India, he was born in Calcutta and completed his primary education in India, and continued secondary school in Cork, Ireland. He graduated in medicine from Queen's College, Cork and joined the Indian Medical Service. He participated in British expeditions to Mandalay in Burma, Royapuram and Mangalore in India, Afghanistan, and finally Madras (now Chennai), where he spent the rest of his service. He was professor at Madras Medical College from 1898 until his retirement in 1919.

== Early life and education ==
Charles Donovan was the eldest of nine children of Irish parents Grace Jennings (née French) and Charles Donovan, who were originally from County Cork. He was born in Calcutta (now Kolkata) in Bengal (now West Bengal), India. His father, a judge, was working in the Indian Civil Service. He attended elementary schools in Dehra Dun and Mussoorie. In 1879, when he was thirteen years of age, he was sent to Ballinadee, County Cork, to live with his paternal grandfather, the Reverend Charles Donovan, at the glebe house associated with Ballinadee Church, the local Church of Ireland church. He continued his education and entered Queen's College, Cork, enrolling on the arts programme, which would have included subjects relevant to the study of medicine. He transferred to Trinity College Dublin, where he completed his BA degree, before returning to Queen's College, Cork in 1885 to begin his medical degree. He received an MB BCh BAO degree in 1889 from the Royal University of Ireland.

== Medical career ==
After clinical training in Dublin hospitals for two years, Donovan was commissioned as captain in the Indian Medical Service in 1891. He was sent to the Royal Army Medical Corps at Netley for probationary training. He set sail for India on 30 September 1891 and reached Bombay (now Mumbai) on 26 October. After a brief stay in India he was stationed at Fort Dufferin in Mandalay. After seven years of service in several expeditionary forces in Burma, India and Afghanistan, he was finally posted in Madras in 1898. He initially worked in the Surgeon General Office before eventually being posted to Madras Medical College and Government General Hospital, both of which were teaching institutions. In the college he was a professor, and in the hospital he was a Second Physician and held the Chair of the Physiology Department. In 1910 he was transferred to Government Royapettah Hospital to become its first Medical Superintendent. He continued to teach at the medical college until his retirement in 1919 with the rank of Lieutenant Colonel.

=== Discovery of Leishmania donovani ===
A fatal infectious disease called visceral leishmaniasis (kala-azar as it was called in Hindi) was widespread in India just after the Indian Rebellion of 1857. The first epidemic was reported in 1870 by British medical officers from Assam. In 1900 William Boog Leishman first discovered the protozoan parasite from an English soldier who was stationed at Dum Dum, West Bengal, and died at the Army Medical School in Netley, England. But he mistook the parasite to be degenerate trypanosomes, already known protozoan parasites in Africa and South America. In 1903 Leishman published his discovery in the British Medical Journal, which appeared on 11 May. It was titled "On the possibility of the occurrence of trypanosomiasis in India." On 17 June 1903 Donovan found the parasites (by then known as "Leishman bodies") from the spleen tissue and in the blood of an infected young boy who was admitted to the Government General Hospital. Donovan identified the Leishman bodies as the causative agents of kala-azar. At the time the disease was believed to be a quinine-resistant malaria. He wrote a commentary of his discovery in relation to that of Leishman in the same journal (using the same title as Leishman's), which appeared on 11 July 1903. Soon a controversy arose as to whom such monumental discovery should be credited. Donovan sent some of his slides to Ronald Ross, who was in Liverpool, and to Alphonse Laveran at the Pasteur Institute in Paris. Laveran and his colleague Félix Mesnil identified the protozoan (and yet wrongly) to be members of Piroplasmida, and gave the scientific name Piroplasma donovanii. It was Ross who resolved the conflict of priority in the discovery and correctly identified the species as member of the novel genus Leishmania. He gave the popular name "Leishman-Donovan bodies", and subsequently the valid binomial Leishmania donovani, thereby equally crediting the two rivals. But the reconciliation was not embraced by Londoners, who still wanted to remove Donovan's name. Donovan's continued works on the biology of L. donovani however established him as the leading authority on kala-azar.

=== Discovery of Klebsiella granulomatis ===
In 1881 a Scottish professor of surgery, Kenneth MacLeod described lesions of dermal ulcer in Madras as "serpiginous ulcer". In 1896 J.H. Conyers and C.W. Daniels reported the same disease as "lupoid form of the so-called groin ulceration" in New Guinea. In 1897 similar symptom was described by J. Galloway as "ulcerating granuloma of the pudendum" from one infected person in London. This became a commonly used medical term. Even after twenty years the nature of the causative agent was elusive. In 1905 Charles Donovan prepared tissue smears from the ulcerative mouth of a ward boy in Madras hospital. Under the microscope he found intracellular bodies as the cause of the lesion. He described these bodies as like "gagantic bacilli with rounded ends." Even though he regarded them as parasitic protozoans, the nature of these bodies was a matter of dispute. They were simply referred to as "Donovan's bodies". In 1910 R.M. Carter demonstrated a large number of the pathogens in large monocytes and he noted their resemblance to protozoans such as Crithidium and Herpetomonas. The description was similar to Donovan's bodies, hence, they were considered to be members of Sporozoa, and the scientific name Donovania granulomatis was introduced. In 1913 H.D. Aragão and G. Vianna gave the binomial Calymmatobacterium granulomatis noting their similarities to bacteria from their (rather dubious) cell culture. The scientific name was ultimately changed to Klebsiella granulomatis based on the phylogenetic relationship with the genus Klebsiella.

== Zoological works ==
He took an interest in the study of butterflies and birds. After retirement he wrote a Catalogue of the Macrolepidoptera of Ireland (1936). Much of the field work for this was carried out in the area of Timoleague, County Cork when he was visiting his sisters there. His twin sisters Bessie Donovan and Grace Lucas were notable collectors of Irish lepidoptera. His brother, the Reverend Richard Donovan, was also involved in collecting entomological specimens. Donovan also studied butterflies in India. In his diary before eight days of his death he made his last notes on butterflies. Some of his collections are still preserved in the Natural History Museum, London, and in Oxford. He also made personal investigations on malaria in monkeys in the Nilgiris.

== Personal life and later years ==
Charles Donovan married Mary Wren Donovan, his cousin and daughter of Dr. Henry Donovan, at Bombay in 1891. They had two daughters Helen and Amy, and a son Reagh. He was a dedicated doctor and inspirational leader that even the sweepers at Madras hospital were able to prepare excellent microscopic slides. He created his self-funded Madras Medical College Athletic Association and invited all the staff to join. He took classes wearing his convocation gown.

After his retirement in 1919, he returned to the UK and settled in a small village, Bourton-on-the-Water, Gloucestershire, at 'Camp House'. His wife died in 1940, and he lived with his two daughters; while his son studied engineering at Cambridge University. He died in 1951 in Moor Cottage Hospital in Bourton. All his children died too in their early adulthood without leaving him any grandchildren.

== Award and recognition ==
- Charles Donovan was decorated with the Tirah Medal of the Indian Medical Service in 1897 for his service in Afghanistan.
- In 1953 "Havelock Ward" was renamed the "Donovan Ward" in Government Royapettah Hospital.
- Klebsiella granulomatis infection is most popularly known as "donovanosis" in medical community.
- University College Cork (was Queen's College in donovan's days) instituted the Charles Donovan Prize for Dermatology.
