= Genital ulcer =

Ulcer located on the genital area

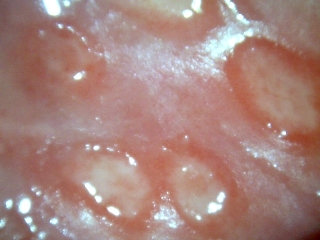
Genital herpes ulcers

A genital ulcer is an open sore located on the genital area, which includes the vulva, penis, perianal region, or anus. Genital ulcers are most commonly caused by infectious agents (fungal infections, secondary bacterial infections, or sexually transmitted infections such as genital herpes, syphilis or chancroid). However, this is not always the case, as a genital ulcer may have noninfectious causes as well.

== Overview ==
A genital ulcer may be located on the vulva, penis, perianal region, or anus. Globally, the incidence of genital ulcers is estimated to be approximately 20 million cases annually. The most likely cause of a genital ulcer varies depending on the characteristics of a population and location. The most common cause of genital ulcers in the US is herpes simplex infections, with syphilis the second most common cause, and chancroid the third. These common causes of genital ulcer disease (HSV-1, HSV-2 and treponema pallidum) can all be efficiently transmitted through oral sex, as well as anal and vaginal sex.

Important signs associated with genital ulcers that may assist in the diagnosis of the cause of the genital ulcer may include the presence of tender or non-tender enlarged lymph nodes in the groin area, a painful or non-painful genital ulcer, or the presence of vesicular lesions, which are small, painful, elevated blisters.

The most common causes of a genital ulcer include infectious agents, with sexually transmitted infections being the most common, but which can also include fungal infections and secondary bacterial infections. While infectious agents are the most common cause, a genital ulcer may also be the result of non-infectious causes such as Behcet's syndrome, lupus, or psoriasis.

Since it is difficult to determine a cause of a genital ulcer from history, examination, and population characteristics alone, further testing is often needed. The most common diagnostic tools used are targeted towards the most common etiologies of genital ulcers: syphilis (syphilis serology, PCR testing, or dark-field examination), herpes simplex virus (PCR, culture, or type specific HSV antibodies), and haemophilus ducreyi (culture on special media currently not widely available in most hospital systems) if the individual is in a known endemic region. Further diagnostic tools such as a biopsy or culture are often utilized if ulcers appear unusual or do not respond as expected to therapy.

Since genital ulcers are often infectious in origin, there is an increased risk of acquiring HIV in a HIV negative patient through viral introduction through the open sore Conversely, there is an increased risk of HIV transmission through increased shedding of viral HIV in the presence of a genital ulcer in a patient with a history of HIV. Available studies did not give enough evidence that treatment of genital ulcer reduce the sexual infection of HIV. However, genital ulcer need to be treated regardless of HIV infection probability of the treatment. The CDC recommends testing for HIV in any individual presenting for a genital ulcer who does not already have a history of HIV.

== Infectious sexually transmitted causes ==
Risk factors for sexually transmitted genital ulcers are similar to the risk factors for most sexually transmitted infections which include multiple sex partners, alcohol, illicit drug use, homelessness, poverty, inmates, men who have sex with men, sexually active teenagers, sexual contact without contraceptive use, and unstable housing. The most common cause of genital ulcers in the North America and Western Europe are the result of HSV or syphilis infections, while the most common cause in other parts of the world is chancroid. Most sexually active adolescents with genital ulcers have a herpes simplex virus infection, more commonly type 2. Meanwhile, according to 2017 CDC reports, syphilis is more common in men who have sex with men populations although rates of syphilis have been rising in heterosexual men and women in the United States. Following syphilis and genital herpes infections, a chancroid is the third most common cause but tends to occur in focused outbreaks over time. While rates of H. ducreyi infection seem to be declining according to a 2017 report, it is possible this may be due to lack of testing since H. ducreyi requires a very specialized culture medium which is not commonly available. Less common causes include lymphogranuloma venereum, which is more common in men who have sex with men, and granuloma inguinale, which is more common in tropical regions globally. rather than in the US.

Disease	Infectious cause	Clinical signs	Diagnostic tests	Treatment
Genital herpes infection	Herpes simplex virus type 1 or type 2	Multiple painful vesicular lesions that can rupture to form shallow ulcers. Often will have painless lymph node enlargement.	Cell culture and PCR, HSV specific antibodies	Antivirals
Syphilis	Treponema pallidum	Single painless ulcer with well marked borders (chancre) during the primary syphilis infection stage that often goes unnoticed until the disease progresses to secondary and tertiary stage of symptoms. May be associated with mild painful lymph node enlargement.	serology, PCR, dark field microscope examination	Antibiotics
Chancroid	Haemophilus ducreyi	Single painful ulcer with drainage of pus and a friable base. Often associated with painful regional lymph node enlargement that can develop into bullae.	Special culture medium for haemophilus	Antibiotics
Lymphogranuloma venereum	Chlamydia trachomatis serovars L1, L2, or L3	Often presents as a unilateral painful regional lymph node enlargement. While there is sometimes a genital ulcer, it often resolves prior to medical evaluation or goes undetected since the ulcer is often small and painless. This is a systemic disease that can mimic many other inflammatory diseases.	Serology, PCR, culture, biopsy	Antibiotics
Granuloma inguinale	Klebsiella granulomatis	Beefy red painless ulcers with rare regional lymph node enlargement which progressively worsens over time.	Difficult to culture so requires tissue biopsy to identify organism	Antibiotics

== Non-infectious causes ==
Genital ulcers are not strictly a sign of a sexually transmitted illness, although non-infectious sources are significantly more infrequent in comparison. The most common non-infectious sources of genital ulcers are first Behcet's disease, and second drug reaction.

Behcet's syndrome is a chronic systemic vasculitis infection that is defined by recurrent oral and genital aphthous ulcers but can also affect many other organ systems, such as the eyes, ears, nervous system, heart, lungs, joints, and intestines. Behcet's syndrome commonly presents in the 30-40 age range and is more common in the Middle East and Asia. There is a familial component to Behcet's syndrome since it has associations with the HLA-B51 gene.

Causes of drug induced genital ulcers take the form of Stevens–Johnson syndrome, toxic epidermal necrolysis, erythema multiforme, and fixed drug eruptions in response to a diverse list of medications. Stevens–Johnson syndrome and toxic epidermal necrolysis are more likely than erythema multiforme to have genital manifestations although all present with a toxic appearing patient. A fixed drug eruption in comparison does not present as a toxic appearing patient but rather single or multiple erythematous patches that vary in size and shape which eventually turn dark brown in color and become itchy. The defining characteristic is that these drug eruptions appear in the same location each time the offending medication is used, and will resolve on their own.

Other potential causes of non-infectious genital ulcers are diverse, but can include sexual trauma, Lipschütz ulcers, inflammatory bowel diseases such as Crohn's disease, lichen planus, lichen sclerosis, and immunobullous disease such as pemphigous vulgaris, since bullous pemphigoid is less likely to occur on the genitals. Cancers of the vulva and penis, with the most common subtype being squamous cell carcinoma, can also present as genital ulcers, but leukemias such as chronic lymphocytic leukemia and acute promyelotic leukemia have also been identified.

== Infectious non-sexually transmitted causes ==
Even lesser common etiologies of genital ulcers include fungal infection, secondary bacterial infections, and parasitic infections. Fungal infections are rare causes of genital ulcers, but candida albicans infection is typically the most common source, and is more prevalent in patients with a history of diabetes mellitus, chronic steroid use, or other immunodeficiencies. There have also been rare case reports of paracoccidioidomycosis, zygomycosis and histoplasmosis infections causing genital ulcers. Parasitic infections such as amoebiasis and leishmaniasis can present in cutaneous form in the genital regions. This can be confused with a sexually transmitted infection or sepsis due to their tendency to present with additional systemic symptoms.

Genital tuberculosis can also present as a genital ulcer, either in the form of cutaneous tuberculosis from a systemic infection, or a primary tuberculosis chancre at the site of inoculation via direct genital contact with infected sputum. Cutaneous tuberculosis typically presents initially as red or yellow nodules that eventually break down to form soft, painful, and roughly circular ulcers, which as a rule are covered in a pseudomembrane. Primary tuberculosis chancre, on the other hand, often presents as a painless ulcer with well defined edges that appears rather nonspecific.
