= Combinatio nova =

Term used in biological taxonomy for a "new combination"

Combinatio nova, abbreviated comb. nov. (sometimes n. comb.), is Latin for "new combination". It is used in taxonomic biology literature when a new name is introduced based on a pre-existing name. The term should not be confused with species nova, used for a previously unnamed species. The new combination replaces the superseded combination.

There are three situations:

- the taxon is moved to a different genus
- an infraspecific taxon is moved to a different species
- the rank of the taxon is changed.

== Examples ==
When an earlier named species is assigned to a different genus, the new genus name is combined with of said species, e.g. when Calymmatobacterium granulomatis was renamed Klebsiella granulomatis, it was referred to as Klebsiella granulomatis comb. nov. to denote it was a new combination.

== See also ==
- Glossary of scientific naming
- Basionym
- List of Latin phrases
- Nomenclature code
