= Chancre =

Genital ulcer

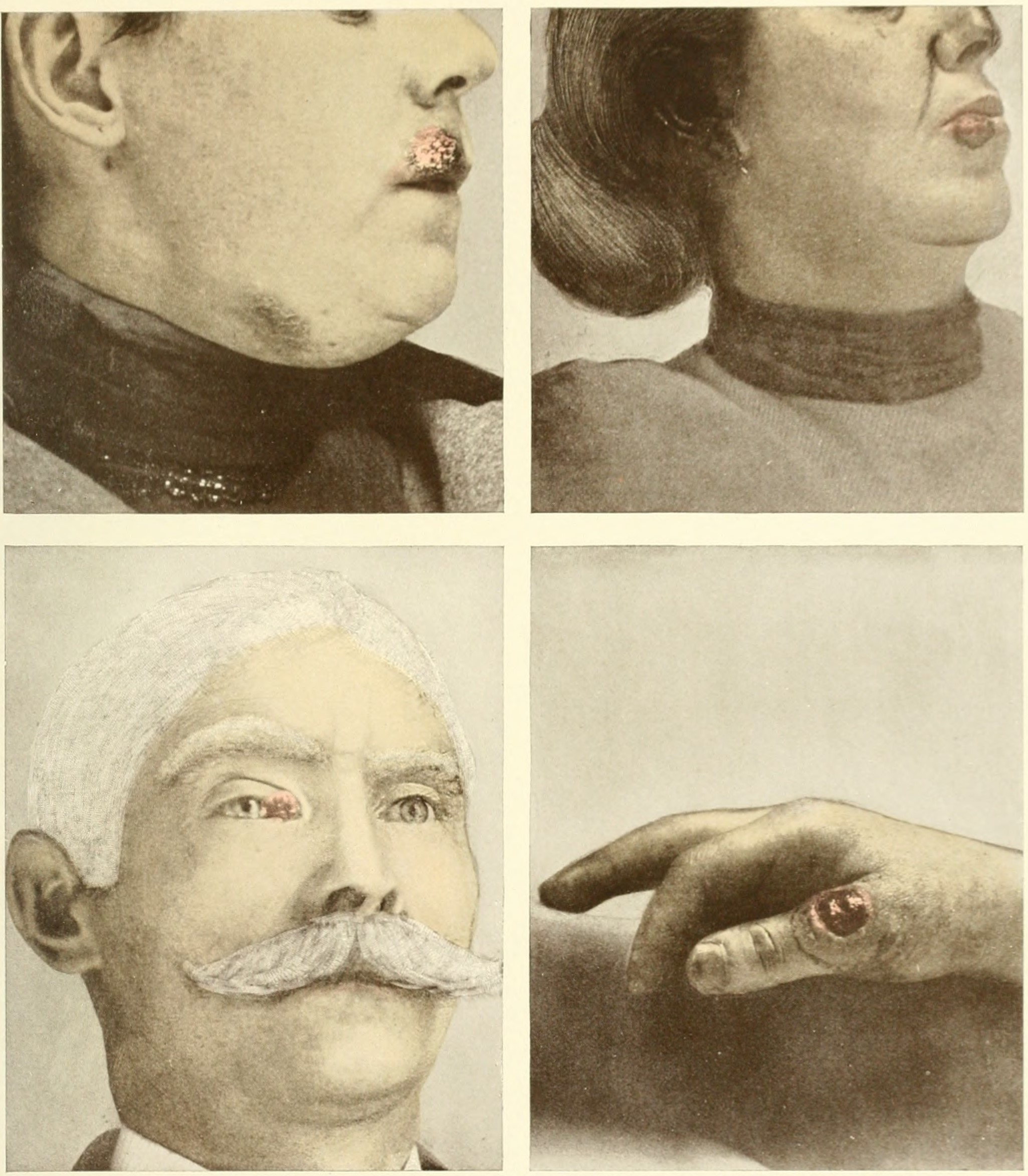
Chancres on the face and hand. Up-left: upper lip, Up-right: lower lip, Bottom-left: right upper eyelid, Bottom-right: thumb.

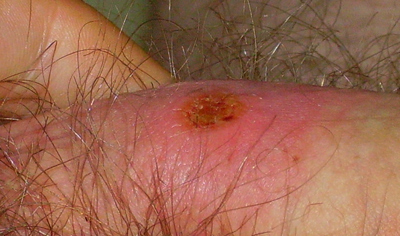
Chancre on the underside of the penis

A chancre (/ˈʃæŋkər/ SHANG-kər) is a painless genital ulcer most commonly formed during the primary stage of syphilis. This infectious lesion forms around 21 days after the initial exposure to Treponema pallidum, the gram-negative spirochaete bacterium causing syphilis, but can range from 10 to 90 days. Without treatment it may persist for two to six weeks before healing. Chancres transmit syphilis through direct physical contact. These ulcers usually form on or around the anus, mouth, penis and vulva.

Chancres are also associated with the African trypanosomiasis (sleeping sickness), surrounding the area of the tsetse fly bite.

== Similarities with chancroid ==
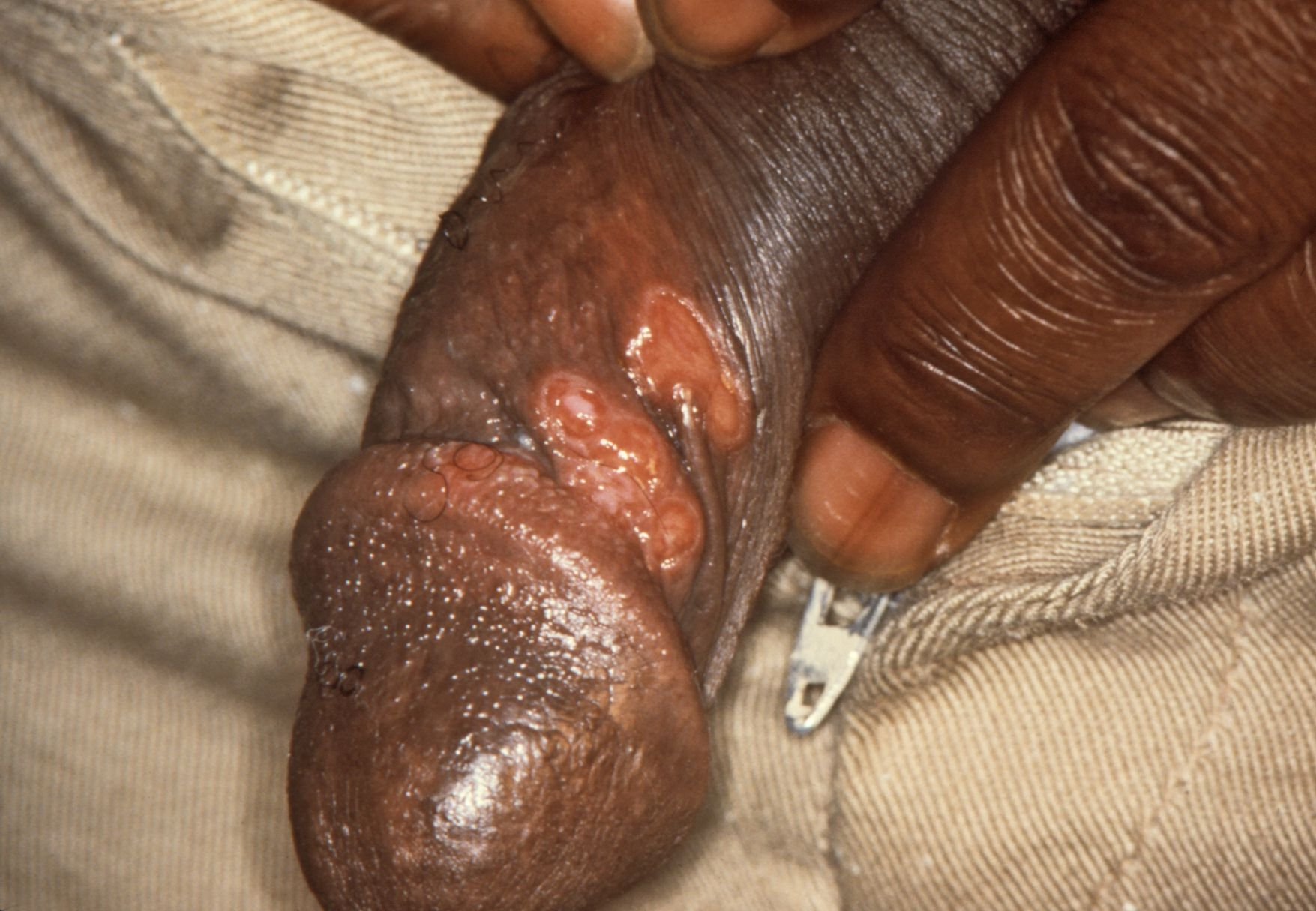
Two chancres on the penile shaft, caused by primary syphilis. Chancres develop at the site of Treponema pallidum inoculation.

Similarities between the conditions chancre and chancroid:

- Both originate as pustules at the site of inoculation, and progress to ulcerated lesions
- Both lesions are typically 1–2 cm in diameter
- Both lesions are caused by sexually transmissible organisms
- Both lesions typically appear on the genitals of infected individuals

== Differences from chancroid ==
Differences between the conditions chancre and chancroid
Chancre	Chancroid
Caused by Treponema pallidum infection	Caused by Haemophilus ducreyi infection
Typically painless	Typically painful
Typically single lesion	Typically multiple lesions
Regional bilateral lymph node enlargement	Regional unilateral lymph node enlargement
Typically exudes serum	Typically has a grey or yellow purulent exudate
Hard (indurated) base with sloping edges	Soft base with undermined edges
Heals spontaneously within three to six weeks	Requires antibiotic treatment

- Chancres can occur in the pharynx as well as on the genitals. Not to be confused with condylomata lata, which is seen in secondary syphilis.

== Etymology ==
The word "chancre" (French pronunciation: [ʃɑ̃kʁ]) means "little ulcer" in Old French. Related to the English "canker", they both come from the Latin cancer, meaning "crab", which is a translation from the Greek word καρκίνος (karkínos), also meaning "crab".

== See also ==
- Primary cutaneous histoplasmosis
