= Cytolethal distending toxin =

- Crystal structure of the fully assembled Haemophilus ducreyi cytolethal distending toxin

Identifiers
- Symbol: CDT
- Pfam: PF03498
- Pfam clan: CL0066
- InterPro: IPR003558
Available protein structures:
- PDB: IPR003558 PF03498 (ECOD; PDBsum)
- AlphaFold: IPR003558; PF03498

Cytolethal distending toxins (abbreviated CDTs) are a class of heterotrimeric toxins produced by certain gram-negative bacteria that display DNase activity. These toxins trigger G2/M cell cycle arrest in specific mammalian cell lines, leading to the enlarged or distended cells for which these toxins are named. Affected cells die by apoptosis.

Each toxin consists of three distinct subunits named alphabetically in the order that their coding genes appear in the cdt operon. Cytolethal distending toxins are classified as AB toxins, with an active ("A") subunit that directly damages DNA and a binding ("B") subunit that helps the toxin attach to the target cells. CdtB is the active subunit and a homolog to mammalian DNase I, whereas CdtA and CdtC make up the binding subunit.

Cytolethal distending toxins are produced by gram-negative pathogenic bacteria from the phylum Pseudomonadota. Many of these bacteria, including Shigella dysenteriae, Haemophilus ducreyi, and Escherichia coli, infect humans. Bacteria that produce CDTs often persistently colonize their host.

== History ==
The first recorded observation of a cytolethal-distending toxin was in 1987 in a pathogenic strain in E. coli isolated from a young patient. Later that year, scientists W.M. Johnson and H. Lior published the journal article "Production of Shiga toxin and a cytolethal distending toxin (CLDT) by serogroups of Shigella spp." in Microbiology Letters. The discovery of other bacteria producing CDT toxins continues to this day.

In 1994 Scott and Kaper cloned and sequenced a cdt operon from another E. coli strain, publishing in Infection and Immunity. The three genes discovered were denoted cdtA, cdtB, and cdtC.

In 1997, the first paper of many to show G2/M cell cycle arrest caused by a cytolethal distending toxin was published in Molecular Microbiology. The study focused on another E. coli strain. This paper was followed by a 1999 publication in Infectious Immunity, which demonstrated that Haemophilus ducreyi CDT causes cell death via apoptosis. This finding was also confirmed for other cytolethal distending toxins in subsequent studies.

The discovery of the homology of cdtB to mammalian DNase I and the current AB model for the toxin were published in early 2000. Further research and the publication of crystal structures for the CDT toxins from two different species continues to support this model.

== Sources ==
All known cytolethal distending toxins are produced by gram-negative bacteria in the Gammaproteobacteria and Campylobacterota. In several cases, the bacteria producing CDT are human pathogens. Medically important CDT producers include:

- Haemophilus ducreyi (chancroids)
- Aggregatibacter actinomycetemcomitans (periodontitis)
- Escherichia coli (various diseases)
- Shigella dysenteriae (dysentery)
- Salmonella enterica serotype Typhi (typhoid fever)
- Campylobacter upsaliensis (enterocolitis)
- Campylobacter jejuni (enterocolitis)

CDT-producing bacteria are often associated with mucosal linings, such as those in the stomach and intestines, and with persistent infections. The toxins are either secreted freely or associated with the membrane of the producing bacteria.

== Nomenclature ==
Individual cytolethal distending toxins are named for the bacterial species that they are isolated from. As of 2011, most scientists have adopted the practice of placing the first letter of both the genus and species in front of the toxin name to reflect its source (i.e., the CDT from Haemaphilus ducreyi is referred to as HdCDT). If several subspecies produce different toxins, as in the case of E. coli, Roman numerals may be added after the second letter. Both complete toxins and individual subunits are labeled using this convention.

In response to the continued discovery of additional cytolethal distending toxins, a 2011 review has proposed that the toxin names be expanded to include the first three letters of the species (i.e., HducCDT for Haemaphilus ducreyi CDT).

== Cellular effects ==
CDT toxins are genotoxins capable of directly damaging DNA in target cells. They are the only AB-type toxins discovered that display DNase activity, allowing them to introduce breaks into the target cell's DNA.

In many cell lines including human fibroblasts, epithelial cells, endothelial cells, and keratinocytes, CDTs cause G2/M cell cycle arrest, cytoplasmic distension, and eventual cell death via apoptosis. Most publications attribute the G2/M cycle arrest to the buildup of irreversible DNA damage from the toxin's DNase activity as the trigger for the G2/M cell cycle arrest, but other research suggests that this model is incomplete. The cytoplasmic distension is a direct result of the G2/M cell cycle arrest. The cell enlarges in preparation for mitosis, but cannot divide to restore its normal size. Aside from classical apoptosis, signs of cellular senescence has also been observed in normal and cancer cell lines (fibroblasts, HeLa and U2-OS) after CDT intoxication

In lymphocytes, cell death occurs quickly and is not preceded by significant cytoplasmic distension. The ability of these toxins to affect lymphocytes differently may be advantageous to the bacteria that utilize these toxins, but the mechanism behind this phenomenon is not yet well understood.

== Toxin structure ==
The active, assembled toxin is a tripartite structure with three distinct subunits- CdtA, CdtB, and CdtC. In terms of function, it is an AB toxin. In this context, the CdtB subunit is actually the catalytically active "A" subunit, and the CdtA and CdtC together form the binding "B" subunit, which helps the toxin bind and enter target cells. Some literature refers to the toxin structure as AB_{2} to reflect the presence of both CdtA and CdtC.

Different from all other CDTs, Salmonella enterica serovar Typhi CDT (SeCDT) has no CdtA and CdtC homologues. However, encoded closely to the active subunit cdtb, the Pertussis-like toxin A and B (pltA/pltB) have been shown to be essential for cellular intoxication. PltA and PltB have a different structure from CdtA and CdtC, thus promoting CdtB activity in a different way. Both PltA and PltB have been found to bind directly to CdtB in vitro. In addition, different from all other CDTs, Salmonella genotoxin is produced only upon bacterial internalization in infected cells, thus the SeCDT traffic may differ remarkably from the canonical ones.

== CdtB ==
CdtB is considered the active subunit of the CDT holotoxin. Microinjection of CdtB into susceptible cells without CdtA or CdtC results in the G2/M cell cycle arrest and cytoplasmic distension characteristic of CDT toxins. The structure of CdtB is well-conserved between different bacteria. The CdtB subunit is the most sequentially conserved between species. The molecular weight of CdtB ranges from 28 kDa to 29 kDa, depending on the species.

As the active subunit, CdtB is termed the "A" subunit according to the AB toxin model. This confusing nomenclature is due to the naming of the toxin's subunits before their individual functions were understood.

=== Activity ===
CdtB exhibits at least two enzymatic activities- DNase activity capable of introducing double-strand breaks in DNA, and a phosphatase activity that resembles phosphatidylinositol 3,4,5-triphosphatase. Both activities can be demonstrated in vitro in the absence of the other two subunits. The relative importance of each activity in vivo is unclear. Mutations that reduce either activity also reduce the toxin's ability to induce G2/M phase arrest in at least some of the susceptible cell lines.

=== Similarities to mammalian DNase I ===
CdtB is functionally homologous to mammalian DNase I and contains a conserved pentapeptide sequence found in all DNase I enzymes to date. In addition, several residues critical to DNase I's ability to break the phosphodiester bonds in the DNA backbone are found in the CdtB structure. A 2002 paper studying the effect of point mutations on five of these residues found that four of the five mutations tested abolished both CdtB's ability to degrade DNA in cell-free extracts and to cause G2/M arrest upon microinjection. The fifth mutation moderately reduced CdtB's activity.

== CdtA and CdtC ==
CdtA and CdtC make up the B subunit of the CDT holotoxin responsible for targeting the CdtB against susceptible cells. Neither subunit appears highly conserved, with sequence identities between different species often lower than 30%. The molecular weight of CdtA ranges from 23 kDa to 30 kDa, whereas CdtC ranges from 19 kDa to 21 kDa depending on the species.

=== Activity ===
CdtA and CdtC are both believed to bind to the surface of target cells. The exact mechanism of this binding is unclear, and may not be conserved between CDT toxins from different species. Proposed targets of CdtA and CdtC binding have included cholesterol, N-linked glycans, and glycosphingolipids. Current research has produced conflicting results on the actual importance of these proposed targets. Both CdtA and CdtC contain lectin domains, suggesting that the toxin may bind via carbohydrates on the target cell's surface, whereas other research has suggested that the targets are surface proteins.
