= Dimethyldisulfanilamide =

4'-(Dimethylsulfamoyl)sulfanilanilide

Clinical data
- Other names: Diseptal A; Albasil; Uleron; Uliron

Identifiers
- IUPAC name: 4-Amino-N-[4-(dimethylsulfamoyl)phenyl]benzenesulfonamide
- CAS Number: 515-67-3
- PubChem CID: 68195
- ChemSpider: 61502
- UNII: 4Q93RMJ3RW
- CompTox Dashboard (EPA): DTXSID90902307

Chemical and physical data
- Formula: C_{14}H_{17}N_{3}O_{4}S_{2}
- Molar mass: 355.43 g·mol^{−1}
- 3D model (JSmol): Interactive image
- SMILES: CN(C)S(=O)(=O)C1=CC=C(C=C1)NS(=O)(=O)C2=CC=C(C=C2)N
- InChI: InChI=1S/C14H17N3O4S2/c1-17(2)23(20,21)14-9-5-12(6-10-14)16-22(18,19)13-7-3-11(15)4-8-13/h3-10,16H,15H2,1-2H3; Key:TYDVXCIBGRTKRO-UHFFFAOYSA-N

Dimethyldisulfanilamide (also known by the brand name Uliron) is a historical sulfonamide antibiotic introduced in 1938 by IG Farben, commonly used during the late 1930s and early 1940s to treat gonorrhea, particularly when earlier sulfonamides like Prontosil were ineffective. It was highly regarded during that period for its rapid action in treating gonorrhea and soft chancre (ulcus molle).
