= Campylobacter upsaliensis =

Scientific classification
- Domain: Bacteria
- Kingdom: Pseudomonadati
- Phylum: Campylobacterota
- Class: "Campylobacteria"
- Order: Campylobacterales
- Family: Campylobacteraceae
- Genus: Campylobacter
- Species: C. upsaliensis

Binomial name
- Campylobacter upsaliensis Sandstedt and Ursing 1991

Species of bacterium

Campylobacter upsaliensis is a gram-negative bacteria in the Campylobacter genus. C. upsaliensis is found worldwide, and is a common cause of campylobacteriosis in humans, as well as gastroenteritis in dogs and cats. Human infections are primarily associated with raw or undercooked meat and contaminated water sources, however there is some zoonotic risk associated with the spread from dogs and cats. C. upsaliensis primarily affects the gastrointestinal tract as it damages gastrointestinal epithelial cells. There are many methods for detecting C. upsaliensis including PCR and ELISA, however there is no current gold standard in detection techniques. Infection is typically self limiting, however there is antimicrobial therapy available.

== Cellular morphology and biochemistry ==
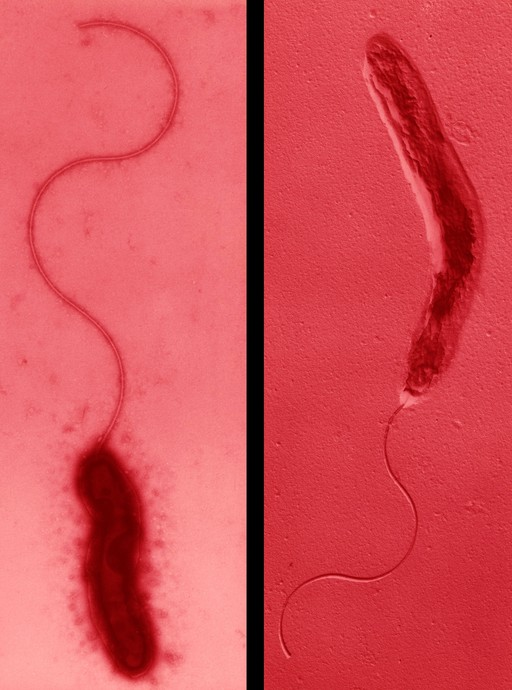
Scanning electron micrograph of a Campylobacter species showing the characteristic curved/spiral appearance, and a single polar flagellum

Campylobacter upsaliensis shares the characteristic appearance of other Campylobacter species: it is a curved to spiral, gram-negative rod that displays darting motility. The bacterium either have one polar flagellum, or two flagella with one at either end, and can range from 0.2μm to 0.5μm in width and 0.5μm to 8μm in length. When grown on blood agar the colonies appear smooth, well defined, and grey to translucent. C. upsaliensis is catalase negative, distinguishing it from some other Campylobacter species which are catalase positive. This species is also considered thermotolerant, having been shown to grow in culture at 42 °C, and microaerophilic, generally requiring an oxygen concentration around 5%. In addition, C. upsaliensis is oxidase positive, like many other species within the genera.

== Epidemiology ==
Campylobacter upsaliensis is found worldwide and is among the predominant Campylobacter spp. associated with enteritis in companion animals. Diarrhetic dogs are considered a possible source for human infections, though there may also be host-specific strains. Sources for companion animals include raw or undercooked meats, especially poultry. Poor sanitary conditions in kennels and shelters where animals are in direct contact with feces have also been implicated. Humans can become infected after contact with contaminated cat and dog feces, which accounts for a small percentage of human campylobacteriosis cases. The majority of human cases are food-borne. Younger animals and children with underdeveloped immune systems are at greatest risk of infection. C. upsaliensis infections are usually isolated events that don't evolve into outbreaks, and the infection is generally self-limiting.

Dogs and cats may also be asymptomatically infected and act as carriers, so dog and cat feces should always be handled carefully even if the animal isn't diarrhetic. It is unknown how long infected animals shed C. upsaliensis in feces, but stressful events may increase shedding. The proportion of animals carrying C. upsaliensis is 66% in cats 75% in dogs.

== Disease ==
=== Dogs ===
In dogs, Campylobacter upsaliensis can cause a mild to moderate form bacterial gastroenteritis. It is also frequently associated with part of the normal microbiota in a large proportion of dogs. In affected animals, symptoms include watery to mucoid diarrhea, abdominal cramping, lethargy and fever. The infection is typically self limiting and doesn't require intervention. Since C.upsaliensis is isolated from many healthy dogs, a positive identification of C. upsaliensisfrom a diarrhetic dog does not necessarily indicate causation.

=== Humans ===
Campylobacter upsaliensis infections in humans can cause campylobacteriosis, a more significant gastroenteritis. C. upsaliensis is the second most common Campylobacter species isolated in humans with diarrhea (behind Campylobacter jejuni). Clinical signs include fever, diarrhea (sometimes bloody), and stomach cramps. It is typically a self limiting infection, however immunosuppressed individuals are more at risk for adverse events, such as sepsis. Campylobacteriosis is typically associated with ingestion of contaminated meat products, however there is some zoonotic risk of pet ownership, as many dogs are asymptomatic shedders of the bacteria.

Other Campylobacter species (C. jejuni) have been clearly linked to causing Guillain-Barre Syndrome, an autoimmune disorder causing muscle weakness and flaccid paralysis. There is less evidence that Guillain-Barre syndrome may be a potential sequela of Campylobacter upsaliensis infection, however C. upsaliensis has been cultured from individuals with Guillain-Barre, indicating that a potential relationship between the two cannot be ruled out.

== Virulence ==
Research into the virulence characteristics of this pathogen remains limited due to its high susceptibility to the antibiotics commonly used in Campylobacter selective media. A deeper understanding of these traits could improve susceptibility testing, aid in the development of new antimicrobial therapies, and assist in controlling the spread of the pathogen.

While a dog or cat can be asymptomatic, they may be a carrier and shed the microbe for long periods of time. The transmission of C. upsaliensis occurs by a fecal-oral route; most commonly via contaminated meat, dairy products, and other contaminated food and water sources. Severity of the disease depends on quantity of organisms ingested, other gastrointestinal pathogens present, prior exposure and the immune system of the animal. Since the optimal growth temperature, and pH for Campylobacter species are between 37 and 42 °C, and 6.5–7.5 respectively, the GI tract provides a good environment for its growth.

The characteristic corkscrew motility of C. upsaliensis allows it to dock to the mucus (on enterocytes) before reaching the epithelial cells- it expresses adhesin(s) that recognize mucin on epithelial cells, with which it can gains access to plasma membrane receptors. Via the protein encoded by licABCD gene, it then acquires choline to produce phosphorylcholine which is transferred to lipoteichoic acids thus allowing attachment to epithelial cells. The flagella on Campylobacter functions as a type III secretion system to secrete several toxins. One of these toxins has a cytolethal distending function. It is a tripartite toxin that penetrates host epithelial cell nucleus, breaks double stranded DNA, resulting in arrest of cell cycle in G2 phase, increase in host-pathogen contact time, disruption of tight junctions, and increase in overall intestinal permeability. There is no research that shows that this microbe internalizes itself into the host epithelial cells, as part of its virulence.

A typical infection results in inflammation of lamina propria, with an infiltration of neutrophils and mononuclear cells. Lesions are grossly seen as diffuse colonic inflammation. Hemorrhage and edema can therefore be visible on intestines. Acute diarrhea (fluid, mucoid, or bloody feces), vomiting, anorexia and fever can be seen clinically.

== Diagnosis ==
Because Campylobacter upsaliensis is considered a commensal bacteria of the gastrointestinal tract in many animals, diagnosis of C. upsaliensis can be cumbersome and laboratory results should be taken into consideration with regards to the context of the patient and other diagnostics. Vomiting, diarrhea, dysentery, fever, and abdominal pain are all common symptoms seen in Campylobacteriosis infections. Ruling out infectious diseases, underlying pathologies of other organ systems with blood chemistry panels, and obstructive disorders with radiographs are all elements of a thorough work-up in these cases. Preliminary diagnostics could include a gram stain fecal smear looking characteristic corkscrew-like motility and gram-negative staining. This only confirms the presence of Campylobacter-like-organisms to warrant further diagnostics. There are many laboratory testing methods that have been implemented for Campylobacter spp. Identification including culture based methods, biochemical testing, immunoassays, and molecular methods such as PCR and whole genome sequencing. Despite the vast array of methods available, no gold standard method of diagnostic test has been agreed upon, and each method has its benefits and drawbacks that should be considered within the scope of each case.

=== Culture methods ===
For best isolation results, it is imperative that fecal samples be collected, refrigerated and sent to the diagnostic laboratory as soon as possible to maintain sample integrity. For rectal swabs, Amies or Cary–Blair transport mediums are recommended in order to protect the sample from toxic effects of oxygen on Campylobacter species. Traditionally, filtration methods have been used to help isolate C. upsaliensis with filter pore size of 0.45 𝛍m in order to decrease contamination from other bacteria and fungi. There are limitations to this method however as samples with less than 105 CFU per gram of feces are not likely to be successfully isolated. Culture environments with 5–10% oxygen and 1–10% carbon dioxide at 37 °C is recommended. Selective medias with oxygen scavenging properties from blood or charcoal are generally used with additions of antibiotics like cefoperazone and antifungals. On blood agars like Skirrow's media, C. upsaliensis colonies appear smooth, pink, regular edged, shiny and convex. On charcoal agars, colonies appear flat, grey with a metallic sheen, and are likely to spread. Theoretically, culture methods are great for susceptibility testing to guide antimicrobial use in addition to its use in identification, however the lack of internationally accepted criteria limits susceptibility testing in this species.

=== Biochemical tests ===
Campylobacter upsaliensis is a catalase negative species that can be further differentiated from other Campylobacter species by its inability to produce hydrogen sulfide on triple sugar iron as well as a positive oxidase test. Additionally it cannot hydrolyze hippurate like other species and is considered sensitive to nalidixic acid. Further strain identification may be warranted in epidemiological investigations and requires serotyping or molecular based methods.

=== Immunoassays ===
ELISA have been developed and utilized in commercial laboratories for Campylobacter species detection however it has been noted that cross reactivity between species remains an issue and validation for its use in diagnosis of campylobacteriosis in companion animals has not yet been confirmed.

=== Molecular methods ===
PCR methods including multiplex and real-time PCR are now routinely used for C. upsaliensis identification and is being favoured for its rapid turnaround time not needing to undergo tedious culturing. Multilocus sequence typing (MLST) has also been implemented for diagnosis of C. upsaliensis where seven fragments of “housekeeping” genes are amplified and cross referenced through a database. This has proven particularly useful for identifying particular strains which may be useful in epidemiological investigations.

=== Other methods ===
Matrix-assisted laser desorption ionization-time of flight (MALDI-TOF) is a diagnostic technology that utilizes mass spectrometry to identify many bacterial species including C. upsaliensis and is becoming more commonly used as it is relatively inexpensive, more rapid than biochemical testing, and relatively accurate. Limitations to its use should be considered in the fact that bacterial culture must first be performed which as previously described, can be difficult with microaerophilic specifications for C. upsaliensis.

== Treatment ==
In humans, most cases of campylobacteriosis caused by C. upsalenisis are self limiting, and do not require any intervention besides fluid and electrolyte therapy. For individuals at risk of more severe disease (immunocompromised, elderly or pregnant women), antibiotic treatment is indicated. The recommended antimicrobial treatment is azithromycin. Ciprofloxacin has historically been another antibiotic of choice, however there is increasing resistance to fluoroquinolone antibiotics in Campylobacter bacteria. Antibiotic sensitivity testing should always be done prior to starting treatment.

Similarly to humans, most cases of Campylobacter upsaliensis in dogs are self limiting, and do not require treatment. If infection is severe and persistent, fluid therapy and antimicrobial therapy are indicated. The antimicrobial of choice in dogs is erythromycin. Due to the potential for zoonosis with Campylobacter upsaliensis infections in dogs, antimicrobial treatment may be beneficial in reducing bacteria shed in faces, thus reducing the risk of humans in contact with the dog.
