= Vestibular adenitis =

- Specialty: Gynecology

Vestibular adenitis is a condition affecting the vagina. It is a chronic inflammation of the lesser vestibular glands, which lie just outside the hymenal ring. The condition can lead to small, extremely painful ulcerations of the vestibular mucosa.
