= Primary cutaneous histoplasmosis =

- Specialty: Dermatology

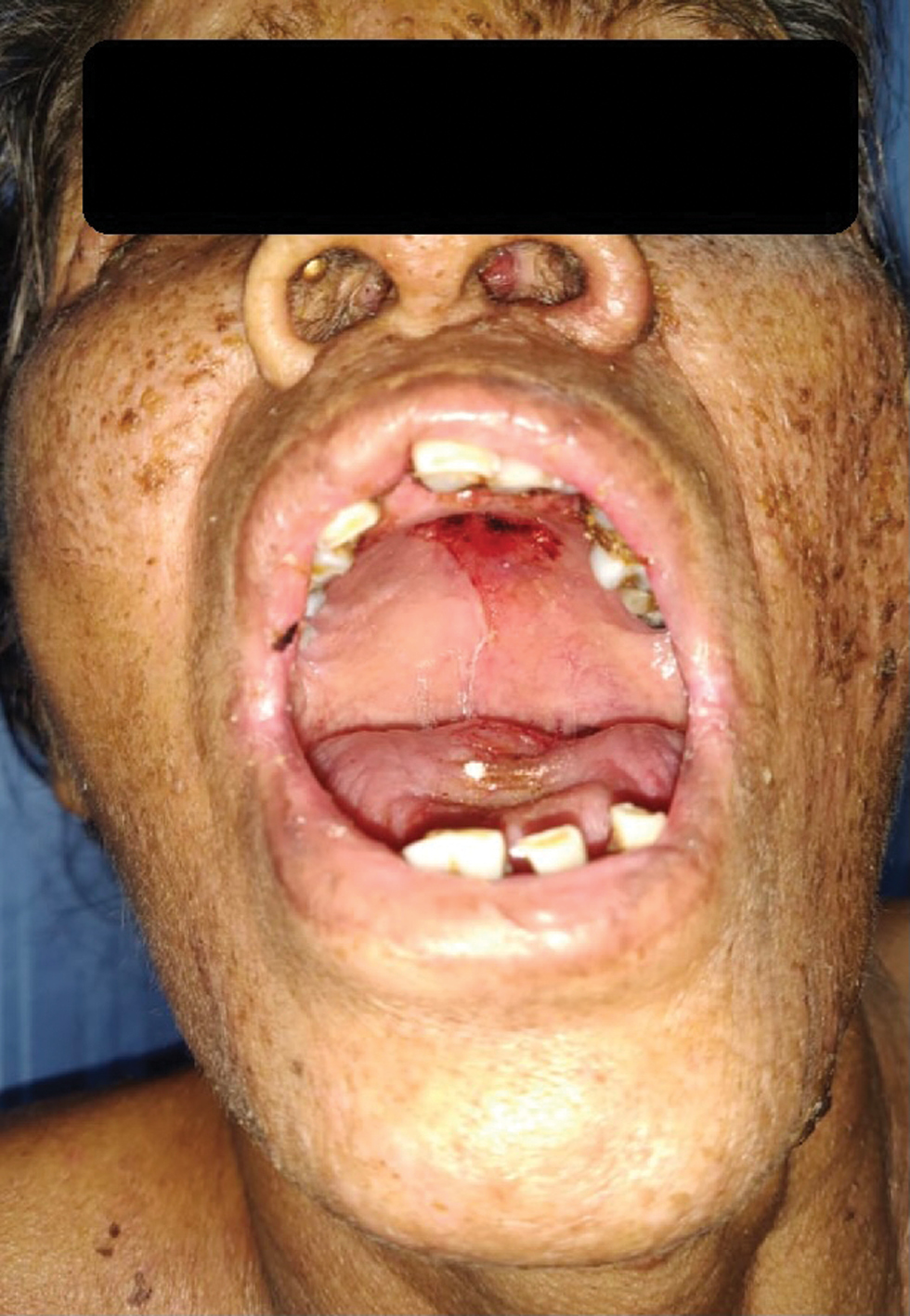
Palate ulcer in a histoplasmosis case

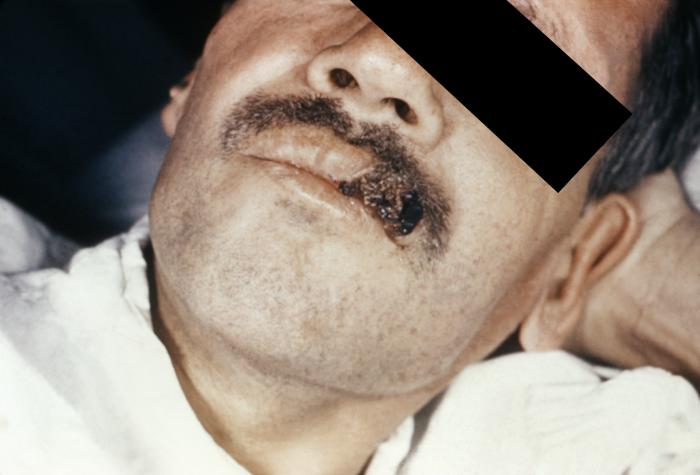
Histoplasmosis due to the fungus Histoplasma capsulatum skin lesion

Primary cutaneous histoplasmosis is a rare skin condition, reported on the penis, characterized by a chancre-type lesion with regional adenopathy.

== See also ==
- Histoplasmosis
