= Lipschütz ulcer =

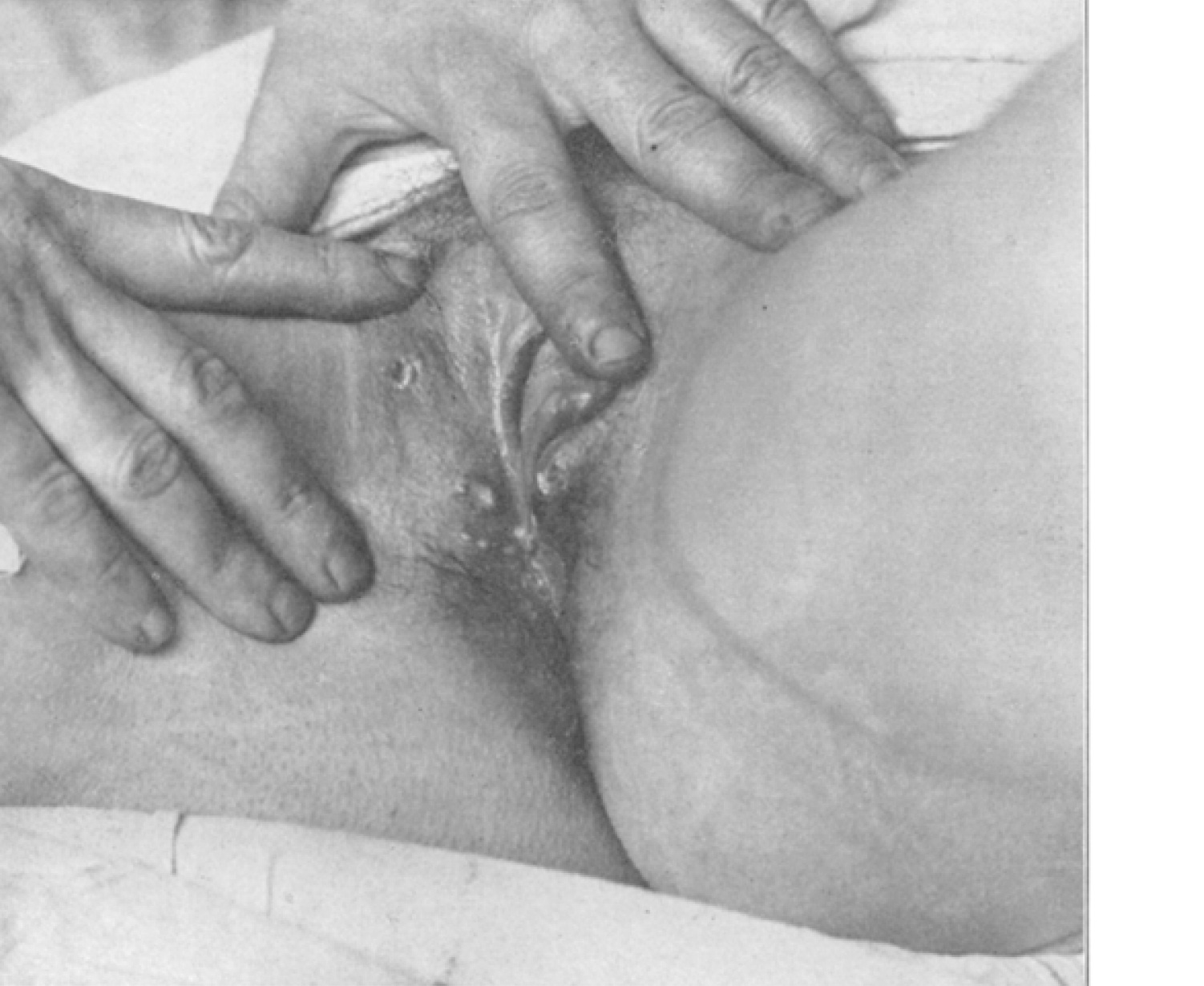
- One of the first published cases of Lipschütz ulcer

Lipschütz ulcer, ulcus vulvae acutum or reactive non-sexually related acute genital ulcers (English: acute ulceration of the vulva) is a rare disease characterized by painful genital ulcers, fever, and lymphadenopathy, occurring most commonly, but not exclusively, in adolescents and young women. Previously, it was described as being more common in virgins. It is not a sexually transmitted infection, and is often misdiagnosed, sometimes as a symptom of Behçet's disease.

Lipschütz ulcer is named after Benjamin Lipschütz, who first described it in 1912. The cause is still unknown, although it has been associated with several infectious causes, including paratyphoid fever, cytomegalovirus, Mycoplasma pneumoniae and Epstein–Barr virus infection

== Signs and symptoms ==
The most common presentation is a single large, deep ulcer (although several smaller ulcers may occur) in the internal surface of one or both labia minora. The labia majora may be affected, as may the vagina and urethra. The ulcer develops very quickly, and is usually preceded by sudden onset of fever and malaise.

== Diagnosis ==
The diagnosis is mainly clinical and centred in eliminating other more common causes for vulvar ulcers. Nevertheless, it has been proposed that Epstein-Barr detection using polymerase chain reaction for virus genome can help to reach sooner a diagnosis.

== Treatment ==
Treatment is symptomatic, and usually of little value; in most cases, the ulcer heals spontaneously within four to six weeks, sometimes leaving scars. Topical analgesics and anesthetics, as well as topical application of disinfectants/astringents such as potassium permanganate (in sitz baths), is commonly used. In severe cases, a combination of systemic glucocorticoids and broad-spectrum antibiotics has been recommended.

== Epidemiology ==
The disorder typically appears among young girls and adolescents but cases in children as young as 17 months have been reported.

== History ==
The disease was first described in October 1912 by Galician-born Austrian dermatologist and microbiologist Benjamin Lipschütz, who published a series of four cases in girls aged 14 to 17. He initially ascribed the ulcer to infection with "Bacillus crassus" (Lactobacillus acidophilus).

== See also ==
- Vulvovaginal health
