= Esthiomene =

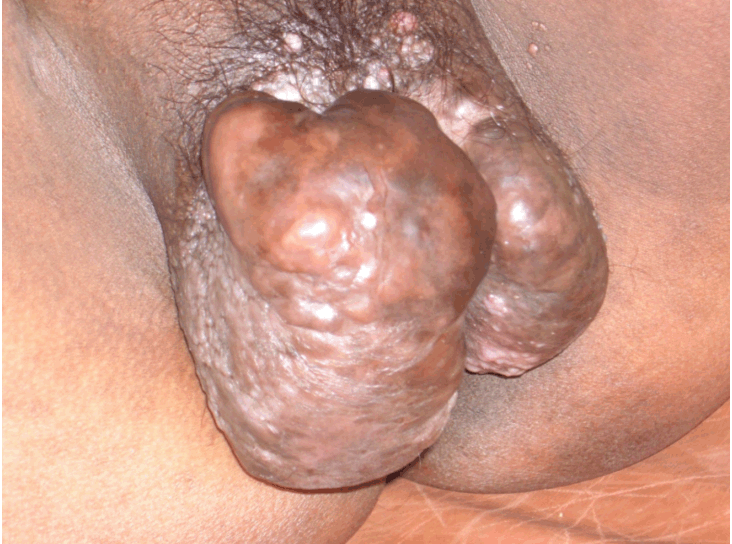
- Esthiomene

Esthiomene is a medical term referring to elephantiasis of the female genitals. In the past, the term has also referred to elephantiasis of the male genitalia.

Esthiomene is generally the visible result of lymphogranuloma venereum, lymphatic infection by Chlamydia trachomatis. This sexually transmitted infection produces inflammation of the lymphatic channels in the female genitalia, followed by abscesses, fistulae, ulcerations, and fibrosis of the tissues. The tissues swell, sometimes severely, and the genitalia may grow to a massive size. Esthiomene can also be the result of tuberculosis when the infection takes hold in the genitalia, or of cancer or filariasis, infection with parasitic roundworms.

The condition is painful and sometimes disabling. People with the condition can experience mental distress from the pain and physical deformation of their genitalia. Masses can become so large they make walking difficult.

Treatment of the condition includes treatment of bacterial chlamydial infections with antibiotics such as doxycycline, or treatment of other infections present. Remaining tissue deformity can be treated with surgery such as labiaplasty to reduce the size of hypertrophied labia minora. Goals of surgery include pain relief, restoration of sexual function, and cosmetic improvement.
