= Granuloma inguinale =

- Other names: Donovanosis
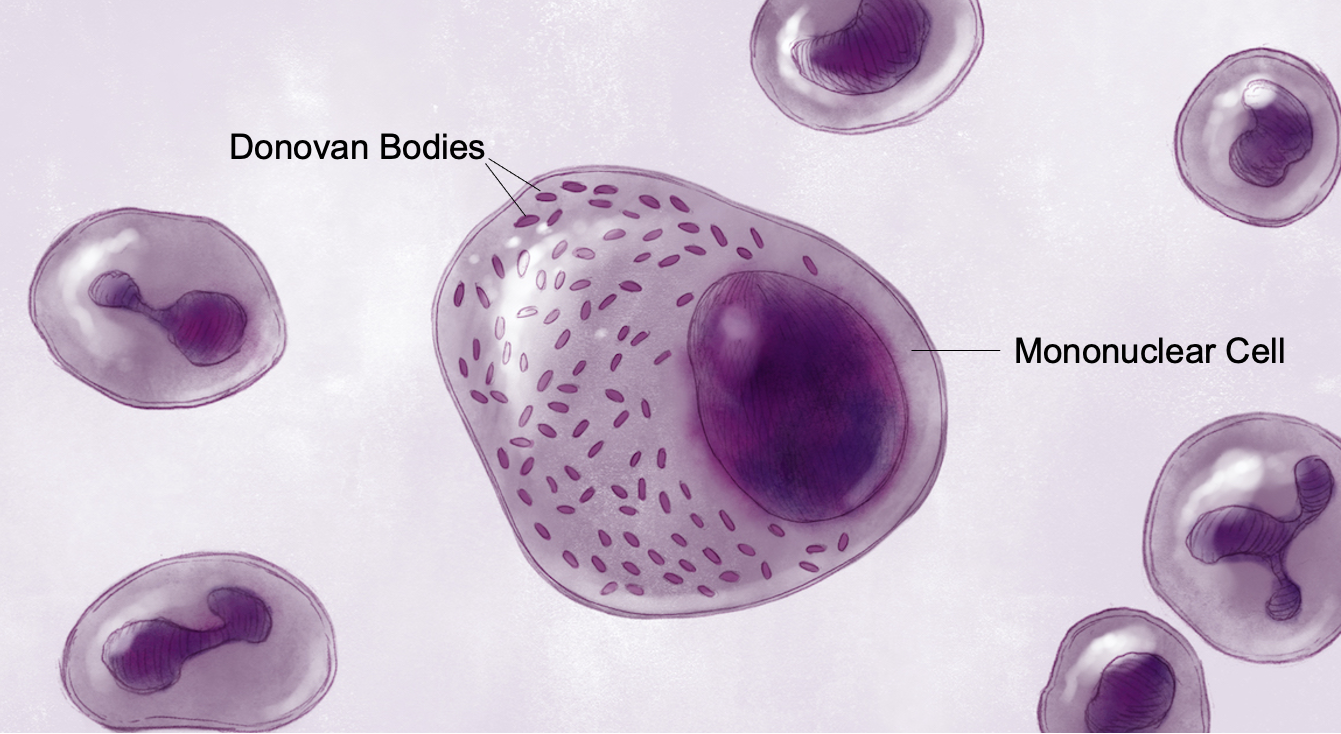
- Drawing of Donovan bodies
- Specialty: Infectious diseases, dermatology

Granuloma inguinale is a bacterial disease caused by Klebsiella granulomatis (formerly known as Calymmatobacterium granulomatis) characterized by genital ulcers. It is endemic in many less-developed regions. It is also known as donovanosis, granuloma genitoinguinale, granuloma inguinale tropicum, granuloma venereum, granuloma venereum genitoinguinale, lupoid form of groin ulceration, serpiginous ulceration of the groin, ulcerating granuloma of the pudendum, and ulcerating sclerosing granuloma. Oral manifestations are also notably seen. The lesions of oral cavity are usually secondary to active genital lesions.

The disease often goes untreated because of the scarcity of medical treatment in the countries in which it is found. In addition, the painless genital ulcers can be mistaken for syphilis. The ulcers ultimately progress to destruction of internal and external tissue, with extensive leakage of mucus and blood from the highly vascular lesions. The destructive nature of donovanosis also increases the risk of superinfection by other pathogenic microbes.

== Symptoms and signs ==
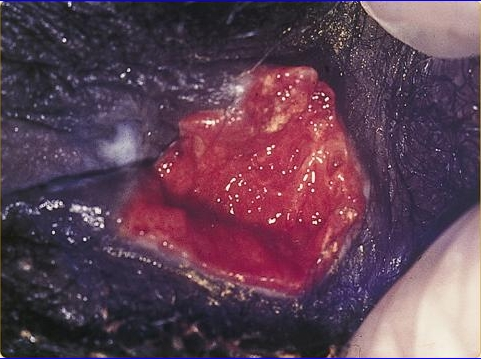
Granulome inguinale on a vulva

Small, painless nodules appear after about 10–40 days of contact with the bacteria. Later, the nodules burst, creating open, fleshy red ulcers with rolled edges that have a tendency to bleed on contact. The infection spreads, mutilating the infected tissue. The infection will continue to destroy the tissue until treated, lesions can spread by autoinoculation. Inguinal spread can lead to the formation of pseudobubo without the involvement of the inguinal lymph nodes. The lesions frequently occur at the region of contact typically found on the shaft of the penis, the labia, or the perineum, and in the oral region due to oral intercourse. Rarely, the vaginal wall or cervix is the site of the lesion. At least one case in India led to partial autoamputation of the penis. The patient tested positive for HIV-2 and had been infected for six years. Genital elephantiasis can occur because of the blockage of the lymphatic channels due to scarring of the ulcers. There is concern that there is a linkage between donovanosis and squamous cell carcinoma.

== Mechanism ==
The microorganism, Klebsiella granulomatis, spreads from one host to another through contact with the open sores. Typically, this contact occurs during sexual intercourse. As a result, granuloma inguinale is considered a sexually transmitted infection.

== Diagnosis ==
The diagnosis is based on the patient's sexual history and on physical examination revealing a painless, "beefy-red ulcer" with a characteristic rolled edge of granulation tissue. In contrast to syphilitic ulcers, inguinal lymphadenopathy is generally mild or absent. Tissue biopsy and Wright-Giemsa stain are used to aid in the diagnosis. The presence of Donovan bodies in the tissue sample confirms donovanosis. Donovan bodies are rod-shaped, oval organisms that can be seen in the cytoplasm of mononuclear phagocytes or histiocytes in tissue samples from patients with granuloma inguinale.

They appear deep purple when stained with Wright's stain. These intracellular inclusions are the encapsulated Gram-negative rods of the causative organisms. They were discovered by Charles Donovan.

=== Classification ===
The first known name for this condition was "serpiginous ulcer", which dates to 1882. The proper clinical designation for donovanosis is "granuloma inguinale". A granuloma is a nodular type of inflammatory reaction, and inguinale refers to the inguinal region, which is commonly involved in this infection. The disease is commonly known as donovanosis, after the Donovan bodies seen on microscopy, which are a diagnostic sign.

The causative organism, Klebsiella granulomatis, was called Calymmatobacterium granulomatis, and some sources still use this classification, from the Greek kalymma (a hood or veil), referring to the lesions that contain the bacteria. Prior to this, it was called Donovania granulomatis, named after the Donovan bodies.

The specific name granulomatis refers to the granulomatous lesions. The organism was recently reclassified under the genus Klebsiella, a drastic taxonomic change since it involved changing the organism's phylum. However, polymerase chain reaction techniques using a colorimetric detection system showed a 99% similarity with other species in the genus Klebsiella. The clinical appearances of this lesion orally are classified into three types: Ulcerative, exuberant, cicatricial.

== Prevention ==
The disease is effectively treated with antibiotics, therefore, developed countries have a very low incidence of donovanosis; about 100 cases are reported each year in the United States. However, sexual contact with individuals in endemic regions dramatically increases the risk of contracting the disease. Using condoms, sexually transmitted infection testing before beginning a sexual relationship, and avoidance of these sexual contacts are effective preventative measures for donovanosis.

== Treatment ==
Recommended regimen is azithromycin 1 gram oral/IV once per week, alternatively doxycycline 100 mg orally twice a day or ciprofloxacin 750 mg orally twice a day or erythromycin base 500 mg orally four times a day or trimethoprim-sulfamethoxazole one double-strength (160 mg/800 mg) tablet orally twice a day. All antibiotic regimens should last for at least 3 weeks and until all lesions have completely healed. Association with gentamicin is sometimes used in severe cases, specially in cases of AIDS. Normally, the infection will begin to subside within a week of treatment, but the full treatment period must be followed to minimize the possibility of relapse. Sporadic surgical resection of the lesions has been used in extensive perineal fistulae refractory to pharmacological intervention. The CDC 2015 guidelines give azithromycin as the antibiotic of choice.

== See also ==
- Chancroid
- List of cutaneous conditions
