= Lymphogranuloma venereum =

Sexually transmitted infection

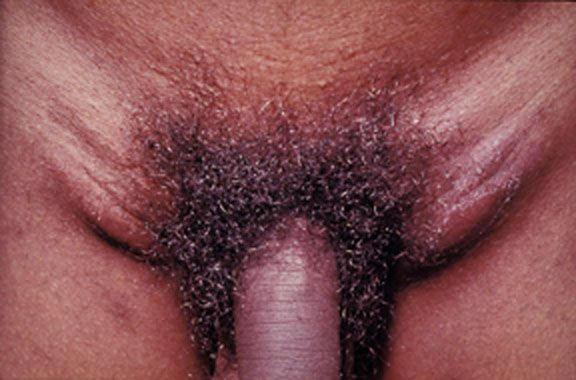
- Lymphogranuloma venereum in a young adult who experienced acute onset of tender, enlarged lymph nodes in both groins
- Specialty: Infectious diseases

Lymphogranuloma venereum (LGV; also known as climatic bubo, Durand–Nicolas–Favre disease, poradenitis inguinale, lymphogranuloma inguinale, and strumous bubo) is a sexually transmitted infection caused by the invasive serovars L1, L2, L2a, L2b, or L3 of Chlamydia trachomatis.

LGV is primarily an infection of lymphatics and lymph nodes. Chlamydia trachomatis is the bacterium responsible for LGV. It gains entrance through breaks in the skin, or it can cross the epithelial cell layer of mucous membranes. The organism travels from the site of inoculation down the lymphatic channels to multiply within mononuclear phagocytes of the lymph nodes it passes.

In developed nations, it was considered rare before 2003. An outbreak in the Netherlands among gay men has led to an increase of LGV in Europe and the United States.

LGV was first described by Wallace in 1833 and again by Durand, Nicolas, and Favre in 1913. Since the 2004 Dutch outbreak many additional cases have been reported, leading to greater surveillance. Soon after the initial Dutch report, national and international health authorities launched warning initiatives and multiple LGV cases were identified in several more European countries (Belgium, France, the UK, Germany, Sweden, Italy and Switzerland) and the US and Canada. All cases reported in Amsterdam and France and a considerable percentage of LGV infections in the UK and Germany were caused by a newly discovered Chlamydia variant, L2b, a.k.a. the Amsterdam variant. The L2b variant could be traced back and was isolated from anal swabs of men who have sex with men (MSM) who visited the STI city clinic of San Francisco in 1981. This finding suggests that the recent LGV outbreak among MSM in industrialised countries is a slowly evolving epidemic. The L2b serovar has also been identified in Australia.

== Signs and symptoms ==
The clinical manifestation of LGV depends on the site of entry of the infectious organism (the sex contact site) and the stage of disease progression.

- Inoculation at the mucous lining of external sex organs (penis and vagina) can lead to the inguinal syndrome named after the formation of buboes or abscesses in the groin (inguinal) region where draining lymph nodes are located. These signs usually appear from 3 days to a month after exposure.
- The rectal syndrome (lymphogranuloma venereum proctitis, or LGVP) arises if the infection takes place via the rectal mucosa (through anal sex) and is mainly characterized by proctocolitis or proctitis symptoms.
- The pharyngeal syndrome is rare. It starts after infection of pharyngeal tissue, and buboes in the neck region can occur.

=== Primary stage ===
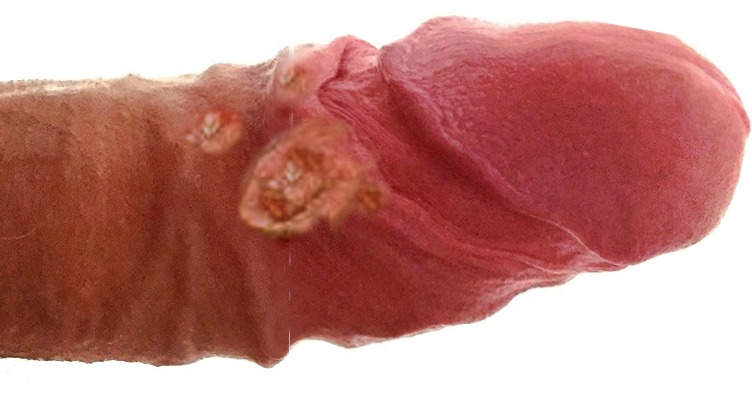
LGV ulcer

LGV may begin as a self-limited painless genital ulcer that occurs at the contact site 3–12 days after infection. Women rarely notice a primary infection because the initial ulceration where the organism penetrates the mucosal layer is often located out of sight, in the vaginal wall. In men fewer than one-third of those infected notice the first signs of LGV. This primary stage heals in a few days. Erythema nodosum occurs in 10% of cases.

=== Secondary stage ===
The secondary stage most often occurs 10–30 days later, but can present up to six months later. The infection spreads to the lymph nodes through lymphatic drainage pathways. The most frequent presenting clinical manifestation of LGV among males whose primary exposure was genital is unilateral (in two-thirds of cases) lymphadenitis and lymphangitis, often with tender inguinal and/or femoral lymphadenopathy because of the drainage pathway for their likely infected areas. Lymphangitis of the dorsal penis may also occur and resembles a string or cord. If the route was anal sex, the infected person may experience lymphadenitis and lymphangitis noted above. They may instead develop proctitis, inflammation limited to the rectum (the distal 10–12 cm) that may be associated with anorectal pain, tenesmus, and rectal discharge, or proctocolitis, inflammation of the colonic mucosa extending to 12 cm above the anus and associated with symptoms of proctitis plus diarrhea or abdominal cramps.

In addition, symptoms may include inflammatory involvement of the perirectal or perianal lymphatic tissues. In females, cervicitis, perimetritis, or salpingitis may occur as well as lymphangitis and lymphadenitis in deeper nodes. Because of lymphatic drainage pathways, some patients develop an abdominal mass which seldom suppurates, and 20–30% develop inguinal lymphadenopathy. Systemic signs which can appear include fever, decreased appetite, and malaise. Diagnosis is more difficult in women and men who have sex with men (MSM) who may not have the inguinal symptoms.

Over the course of the disease, lymph nodes enlarge, as may occur in any infection of the same areas as well. Enlarged nodes are called buboes. Buboes are commonly painful. Nodes commonly become inflamed, thinning and fixation of the overlying skin. These changes may progress to necrosis, fluctuant and suppurative lymph nodes, abscesses, fistulas, strictures, and sinus tracts. During the infection and when it subsides and healing takes place, fibrosis may occur. This can result in varying degrees of lymphatic obstruction, chronic edema, and strictures. These late stages characterised by fibrosis and edema are also known as the third stage of LGV, and are mainly permanent.

== Diagnosis ==
The diagnosis usually is made serologically (through complement fixation) and by exclusion of other causes of inguinal lymphadenopathy or genital ulcers. Serologic testing has a sensitivity of 80% after two weeks. Serologic testing may not be specific for serotype (has some cross reactivity with other chlamydia species) and can suggest LGV from other forms because of their difference in dilution, 1:64 more likely to be LGV and lower than 1:16 is likely to be other chlamydia forms (emedicine).

For identification of serotypes, culture is often used. Culture is difficult. Requiring a special medium, cycloheximide-treated McCoy or HeLa cells, and yields are still only 30–50%. DFA, or direct fluorescent antibody test, PCR of likely infected areas and pus, are also sometimes used. DFA test for the L-type serovar of C. trachomatis is the most sensitive and specific test, but is not readily available.

If polymerase chain reaction (PCR) tests on infected material are positive, subsequent restriction endonuclease pattern analysis of the amplified outer membrane protein A gene can be done to determine the genotype.

A fast realtime PCR (TaqMan analysis) has been developed to diagnose LGV. With this method an accurate diagnosis is feasible within a day. It has been noted that one type of testing may not be thorough enough.

== Treatment ==
Treatment involves antibiotics and may involve drainage of the buboes or abscesses by needle aspiration or incision. Further supportive measure may need to be taken: dilatation of the rectal stricture, repair of rectovaginal fistulae, or colostomy for rectal obstruction.

Common antibiotic treatments include tetracycline (doxycycline) (all tetracyclines, including doxycycline, are contraindicated during pregnancy and in children due to effects on bone development and tooth discoloration), and erythromycin. Azithromycin is also a drug of choice in LGV.

=== Further recommendations ===
As with all STIs, sex partners of patients who have LGV should be examined and tested for urethral or cervical chlamydial infection. After a positive culture for chlamydia, clinical suspicion should be confirmed with testing to distinguish serotype. Antibiotic treatment should be started if they had sexual contact with the patient during the 30 days preceding onset of symptoms in the patient. Patients with a sexually transmitted infection should be tested for other STIs due to high rates of comorbid infections. Antibiotics are not without risks and prophylactic broad antibiotic coverage is not recommended.

== Prognosis ==
Prognosis is highly variable. Spontaneous remission is common. Complete cure can be obtained with proper antibiotic treatments to kill the causative bacteria, such as tetracycline, doxycycline, or erythromycin. Prognosis is more favorable with early treatment. Bacterial superinfections may complicate course. Death can occur from bowel obstruction or perforation, and follicular conjunctivitis due to autoinoculation of infectious discharge can occur.

=== Long-term complications ===
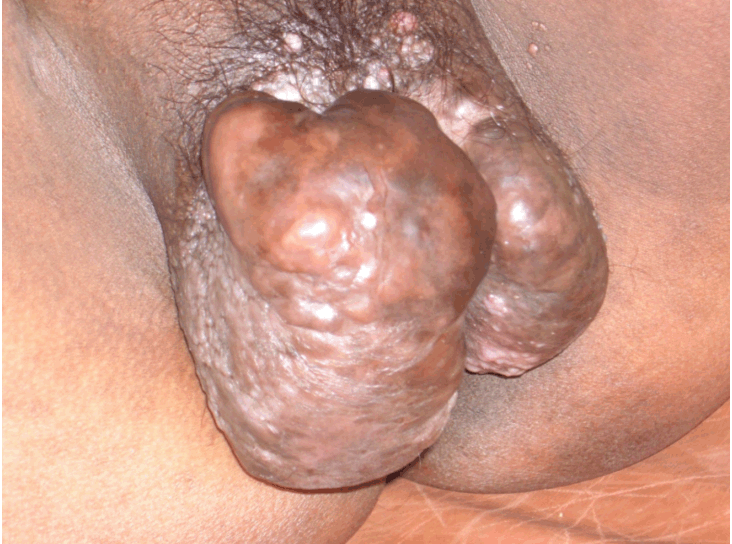
Esthiomene of female genitalia

Genital elephantiasis or esthiomene, which is the dramatic end-result of lymphatic obstruction, which may occur because of the strictures themselves, or fistulas. This is usually seen in females, may ulcerate and often occurs 1 to 20 years after primary infection. Fistulas of, but not limited to, the penis, urethra, vagina, uterus, or rectum. Also, surrounding edema often occurs. Rectal or other strictures and scarring. Systemic spread may occur, possible results are arthritis, pneumonitis, hepatitis, or perihepatitis.
