= Ballinadee =

Village in County Cork, Ireland

Ballinadee Baile na Daibhche
- Village
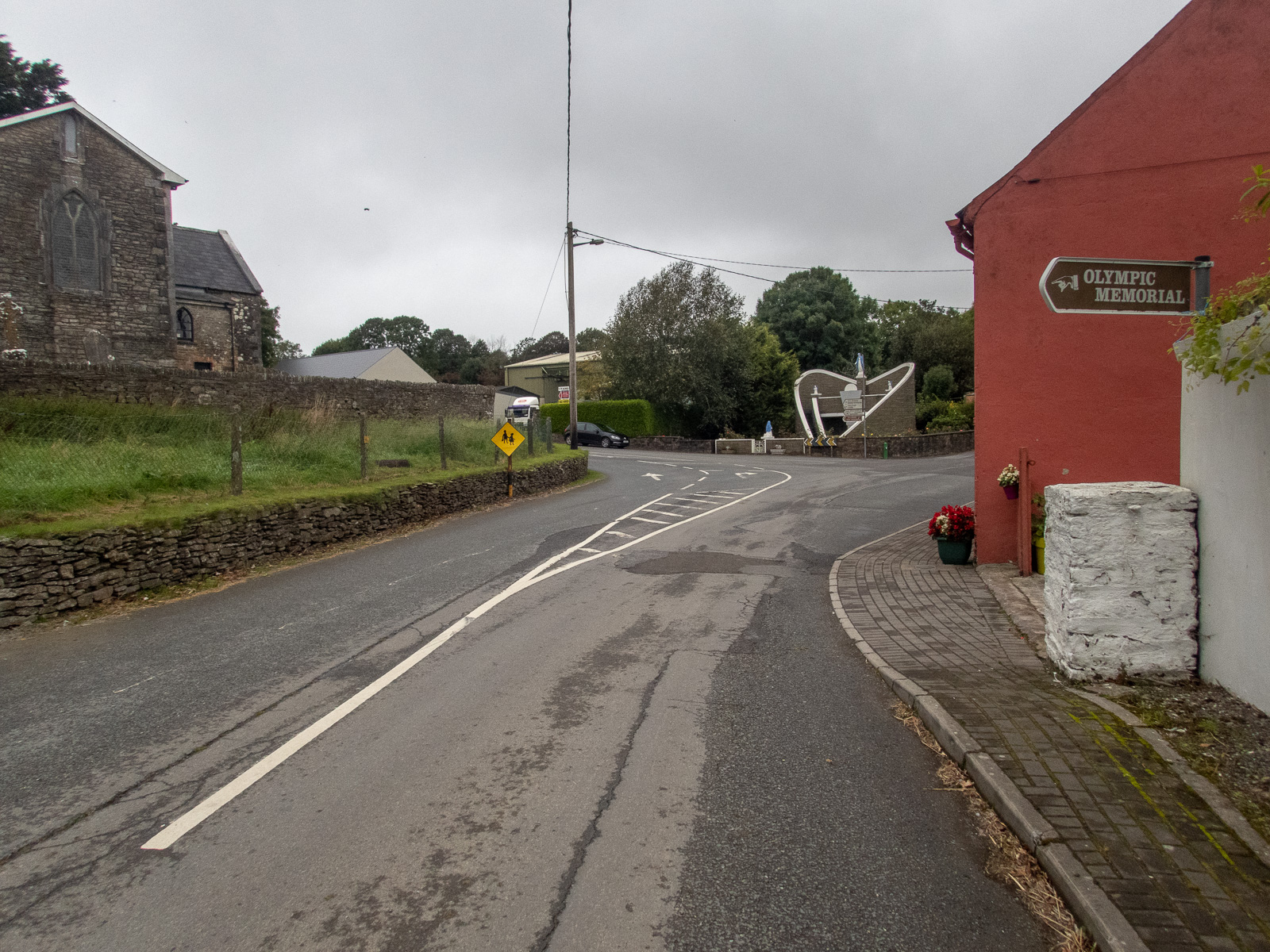
- Ballinadee village

- Location in Ireland
- Coordinates: 51°42′43″N 8°37′37″W
- Country: Ireland
- Province: Munster
- County: County Cork
- Time zone: UTC+0 (WET)
  - Summer (DST): UTC-1 (IST (WEST))
- Irish Grid Reference: W567512

Ballinadee (Irish: Baile na Daibhche) is a village in County Cork, Ireland. It lies in the parish of Courceys, approximately 12 km by road west of Kinsale and 9 km south east of Bandon. Ballinadee is on the banks of the River Pound, which flows into the River Bandon, and has a school, two churches and two pubs. The village is in a townland and civil parish of the same name.

== Built heritage ==
Ballinadee Church, the local Anglican (Church of Ireland) church, has been in the centre of the village since 1759. There is also a large flour mill building nearby, which dates to c. 1800 and which was described in Samuel Lewis's 1837 Topographical Dictionary of Ireland as a "mill of great power, which was much improved in 1836".

== Sport ==
Courcey Rovers GAA is the local Gaelic Athletic Association club based in Ballinspittle and Ballinadee. De Courcey Albion is the local soccer club, also based in Ballinspittle and Ballinadee.

== People ==
- Liam Deasy (1896–1974), Irish Republican Army officer who fought in the Irish War of Independence and the Irish Civil War, was from the area.
- Tom Hales (1892–1966), Irish Republican Army volunteer and politician, was also born near Ballinadee.

== See also ==
- List of towns and villages in Ireland
