= Ballinadee Church =

Anglican church in County Cork, Ireland

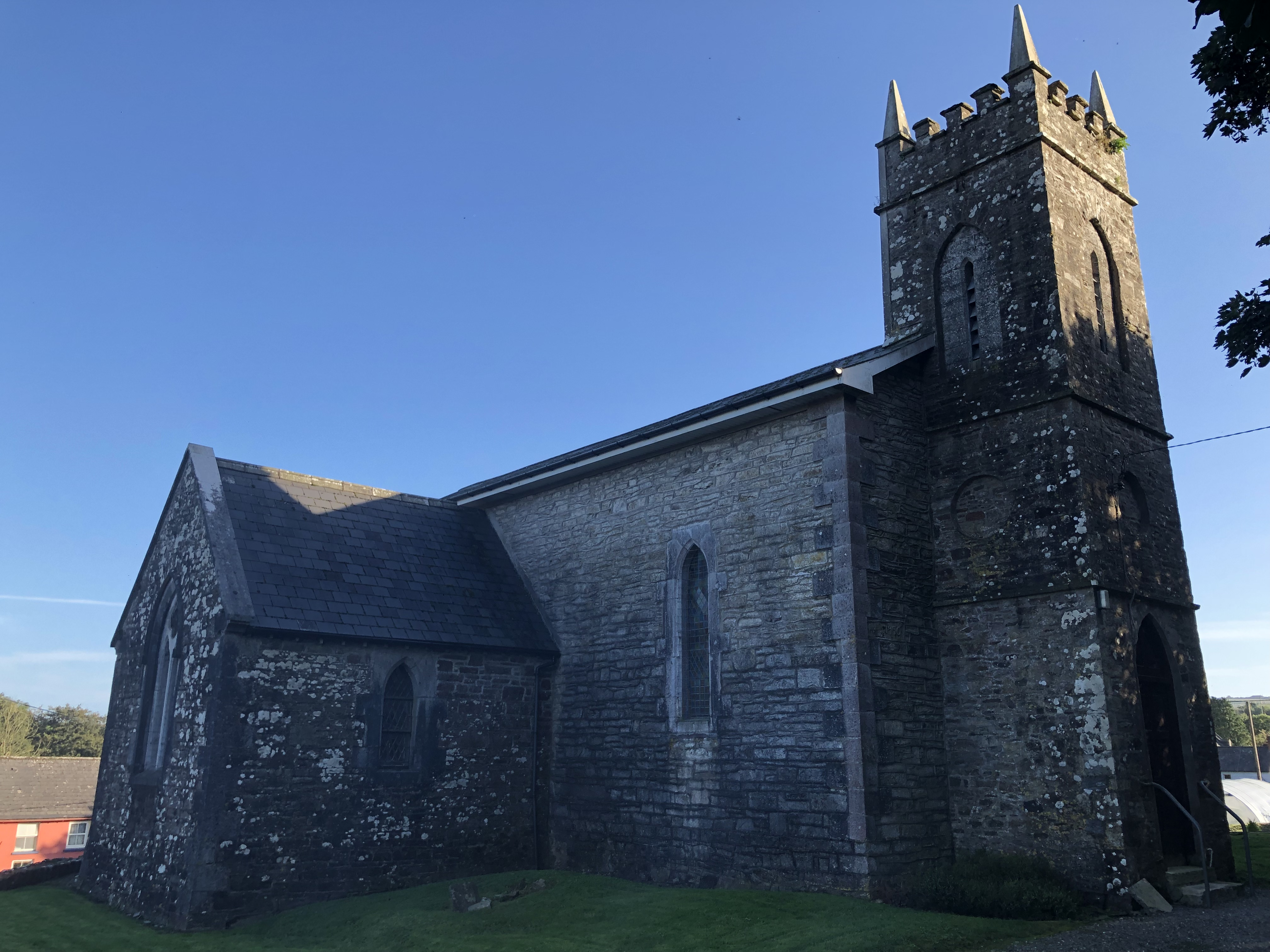
- Ballinadee Church
- 51.711074°N 8.626188°W
- Country: Ireland
- Denomination: Church of Ireland

Architecture
- Completed: 1759

Ballinadee Church is a small Gothic Revival Anglican church located in Ballinadee, County Cork, Ireland. It was completed in 1759. It is part of the Bandon Union of Parishes, in the Diocese of Cork, Cloyne, and Ross.

== History ==
The church was originally built in 1759. The tower was added around 1837. Around this time, the church was also rebuilt.

Ballinadee Church is one of five constituent churches of the Bandon Union of Parishes, of which Denis MacCarthy is the Canon.

== Architecture ==
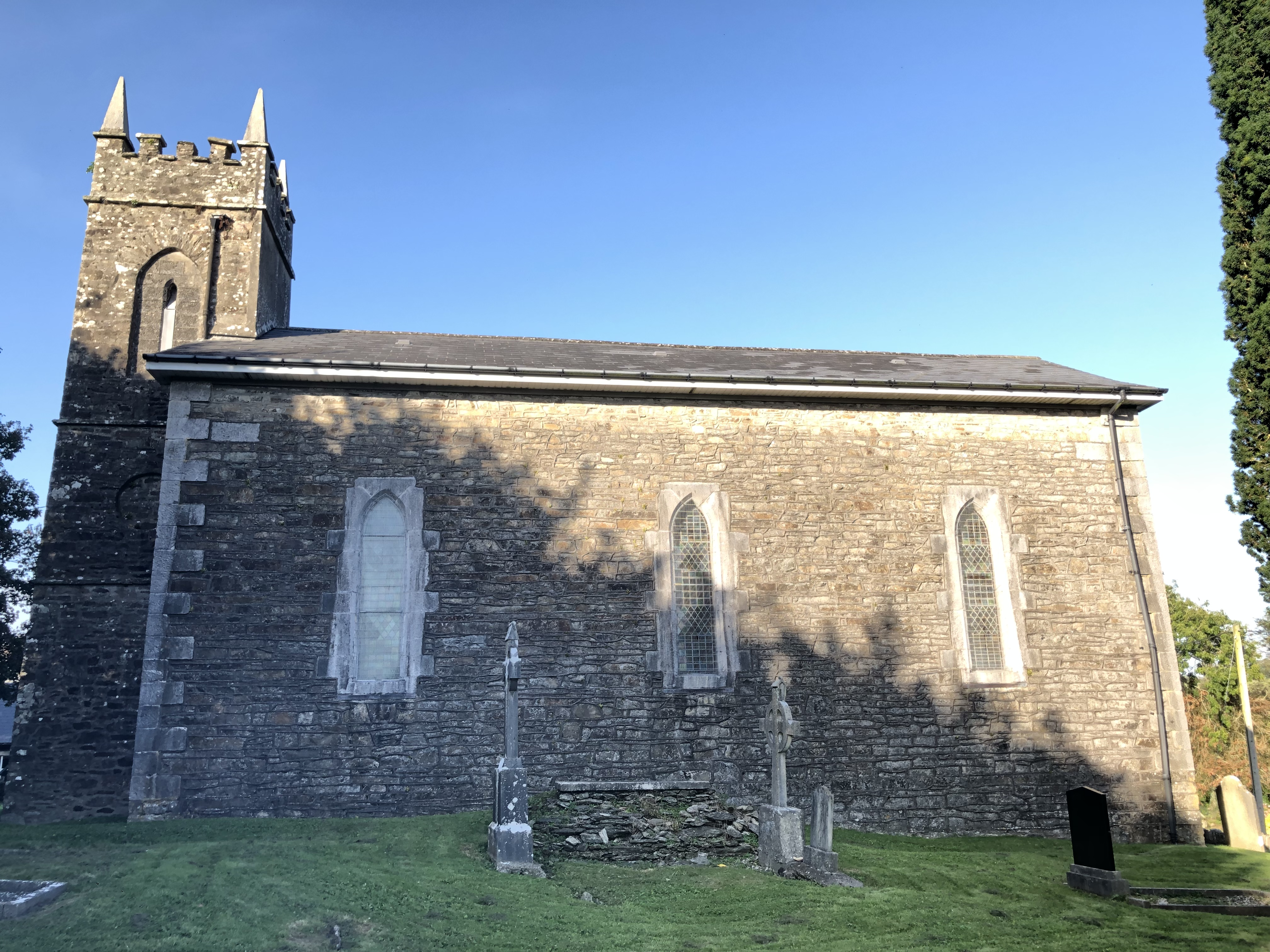
Ballinadee Church viewed from the south

The church building consists of a three-bay nave with a single-bay transept and a three-stage bell tower. The north transept was added by Henry Hill in 1869.
