= Cary–Blair transport medium =

Solution used to preserve clinical samples

Cary–Blair transport medium is a solution used to preserve fecal clinical specimens and rectal swabs after collection. The medium was devised by Sylvia G. Cary and Eugene B. Blair in 1964, who noted it allowed for longer-term recovery of Salmonella, Shigella, Vibrio, and Pasteurella than other transport media.

Cary–Blair transport medium is a modification of a solution devised by R.D. Stuart, S.R. Toshach and T.M. Patsula in 1954 which allowed for high recoverability of Gonococci from fecal samples. Cary and Blair noted Stuart, Toshach and Patsula's medium and other solutions that allowed for long-term recovery of pathogens from feces were characterized by low nutrient content, low oxidation-reduction potential, and high pH.

As of 2024, the use of Cary–Blair transport medium is recommended by the United States Center for Disease Control for laboratory testing of epidemic dysentery and cholera if culture will not begin within two hours
