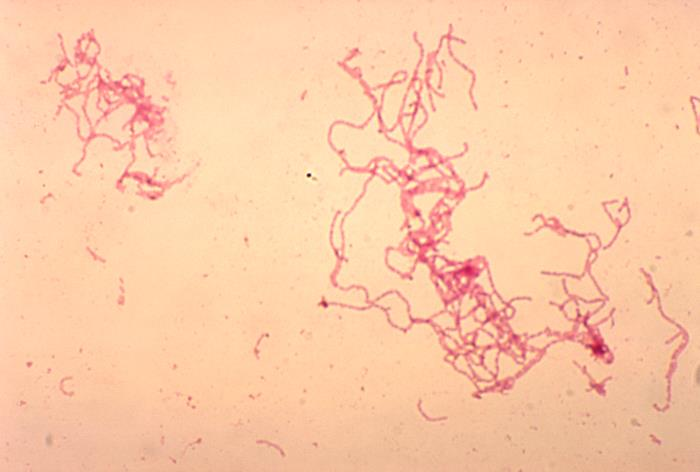
- Photomicrograph of H. ducreyi

Scientific classification
- Domain: Bacteria
- Kingdom: Pseudomonadati
- Phylum: Pseudomonadota
- Class: Gammaproteobacteria
- Order: Pasteurellales
- Family: Pasteurellaceae
- Genus: Haemophilus
- Species: H. ducreyi

Binomial name
- Haemophilus ducreyi (Neveu-Lemaire, 1921); Bergey et al. 1923

= Haemophilus ducreyi =

Species of gram-negative, pathogenic bacterium

Haemophilus ducreyi are fastidious gram-negative coccobacilli bacteria.

This species causes the sexually transmitted disease chancroid, a major cause of genital ulceration in developing countries, often characterized by painful sores on the genitalia. The first study linking this disease with the agent Haemophilus ducreyi was published in 1889 by Auguste Ducrey. Each year in the United States, there are over 2,000 cases of chancroid. Chancroid starts as an erythematous papular lesion that breaks down into a painful bleeding ulcer with a necrotic base and ragged edge. It has also been found to cause chronic skin ulceration away from the genitalia, infect children and adults, and behave in a manner that mimics yaws.

== Morphology ==
Haemophilus ducreyi is a Gram-negative coccobacillus, and has a shape between a spherical coccus and a rod-shaped bacterium. This species of bacterium has pili, fine and tangled appendages composed predominantly of protein, that allow bacteria to attach to surfaces, including those of cells. These pili also functionally aid in motility and allow the bacteria to move within substrate. Sometimes considered to not be a true Haemophilus species as it has a distinct evolutionary lineage within the family Pasteurellaceae, as it shares closer phylogenetic relationships with species such as, Aggregatibacter pleuropneumoniae and Mannheimia haemolytica. H. ducreyi not only expresses many of the same virulence genes with species Actinobacillus sensu stricto, but also expresses many other genes that aid in the cell's ability to move, adhere to neighboring cells, and evade host immune response.

== Genetics ==
H. ducreyi expresses many genes to aid in virulence. Some of these genes include the genes pilA and pilC, which are responsible for pilus assembly, adherence to neighboring surfaces, and are often found in type IV (T4) pili. Presence of gene pilA codes for the structural protein found in T4 pili, and are responsible for pili adhesion and motility and indicates that the pili present on H. ducreyi functionally help it adhere to surfaces and aid in the cell’s motility. The presence of gene pilC helps maintain pili longevity and structure.

Further shared genes include those involved with lipopolysaccharide (LOS) biosynthesis and modifications expressed in gram-negative bacteria. These LOS biosynthesis components indicate that H. ducreyi has an LOS system on its outer membrane, rather than a full lipopolysaccharide (LPS) structure. Instead, it contains lipid A and the core oligosaccharide but is missing the outer chain. The LOS structure can help mimic host structures, ultimately making it harder for the host cell to detect and fight against, contributing to immune evasion.

Furthermore, the presence of lspA1 and lspA2 genes also contributes to virulence in H. ducreyi. Suppression of the lspA1 and lspA2 genes in H. ducreyi reduces the bacteria’s ability to inhibit phagocytosis by host immune cells. The proteins encoded by lspA1 and lpsA2, LPSA1 and LPSA2, interfere with host cell signaling by inhibiting src family protein kinases used in macrophage and neutrophil signaling pathways and ultimately reduce engulfing ability of host immune cells. The presence of these genes in H. ducreyi is an integral part of the bacteria’s ability to evade host immune response and further increase virulence.

== Colonies ==
Colonies of Haemophilus ducreyi are described as yellow-grey, small, and semiopaque as well as nonmucoid. Scanning electron microscopy has been used to observe that the microbe can form a colony of many cells; the cells adhere to each other because of an intercellular matrix. The long chains bond can make it difficult to isolate a single cell of Haemophilus ducreyi, hindering the genetic studies that have been done on the microbe.

== Metabolism ==
The bacterium H. ducreyi falls under a set of bacteria called heme-auxotrophic bacteria. The bacterium does not have the necessary pathway to generate heme on its own; thus, it relies on the human host to obtain the heme required. Heme is needed by this bacterium for energy production via the electron transport chain. This differentiates H. ducreyi from other Haemophilus species, as it needs Heme (X Factor) and not NAD (V Factor). A study was conducted in an agar dilution experiment to see what concentration of heme was optimal for H. ducreyi growth. The results showed that bacterial growth was at its peak between 200-500 µg/ml, where 91% and 87% of the H. ducreyi reached optimal growth.

H. ducreyi has high phosphatase activity, such as acid/alkaline phosphatase and phosphoamidase. Additionally, findings show that there is an complete absence of glycohydrolase activity. Instead, there is a large presence of aminopeptidase activity, thus showing that H. ducreyi gets its energy from breaking down chains of amino acids and does not appear to run on glucose.

H. ducreyi gets heme primarily through HgbA (TonB-dependent receptor), which binds with hemoglobin to get heme. Mutant bacteria lacking HgbA are unable to obtain heme from inside the hemoglobin. However, they can still grow when presented with free heme not locked up within hemoglobin. As HgbA is a TonB-dependent receptor that binds to the surface of hemoglobin, it uses the membrane's energy to grab the heme from inside the hemoglobin. Additionally, without HgbA, it requires high levels of free heme to grow.

== Culture ==
Haemophilus ducreyi is grown under micro-aerophilic conditions achieved in a sealed anaerobic jar without a catalyst, using two envelopes that generate CO_{2} and H_{2}, commonly referred to as Campylobacter growth conditions. The bacteria only grow at a specific temperature range of 33-35°C; any conditions above this range are suboptimal for bacterial growth. To grow H. ducreyi in a lab setting, it is best to do so in a split plate with two different media. Recommended combinations are Gonococcal agar with 2% bovine hemoglobin, 5% fetal calf serum, 1% IsoVitaleX, 3 µg/mL vancomycin; and Mueller-Hinton agar with 5% chocolatized horse blood, 1% IsoVitaleX, 3 µg/mL vancomycin.Therefore, H. ducreyi can be cultured on chocolate agar and incubated in an environment with elevated humidity and CO_{2} enrichment. It is best treated with a macrolide, e.g. azithromycin, and a third-generation cephalosporin, e.g. ceftriaxone.

Additionally, H. ducreyi is asaccharolytic. This makes it difficult to test for in the lab using traditional methods. Therefore, Gram staining is used for H. ducreyi identification to show it is a Gram-negative coccobacillus. A positive cytochrome c oxidase test and a negative catalase test will support the positive identification of H. ducreyi.

== Pathogenesis ==
Haemophilus ducreyi is a human pathogen; and there are no known animal or environmental reservoirs. H. ducreyi is an opportunistic microorganism that infects its host gaining access to the tissue that breaks in the skin or epidermis. Unlike intact skin, the damaged tissue will act as a site that bacterium can start the infection process. Attachment to host cells are crucial for the early stage of establishing infection. The FLp-Tad system will be encoded by the operon known as flp-tad that is essential for the bacterial attachment to host, which will allow for H. ducreyi to finish the site of infection to form the pustular lesions. Inflammation then takes place as the area of infection is inundated with lymphocytes, macrophages, and granulocytes. This pyogenic inflammation causes regional lymphadenitis in the sexually transmitted disease chancroid.

== Toxins ==
Haemophilus ducreyi is able to defend itself against the immune response's T cells through two toxins: a hemolysin and the cytolethal distending toxin (CDT). CDT is characterized by its ability to arrest epithelial cells in the G2 phase of the cell cycle and combats T cells by inducing apoptosis. Together, these toxins showcase the adeptness of H. ducreyi in manipulating host cell processes.

== Diagnosis ==
Although antigen detection, serology, and genetic amplification methods are sometimes used to diagnose infections with H. ducreyi and the genetic tests have greater sensitivity, they are not widely available, so cultures are currently considered the "gold standard" test, which has about 80% sensitivity under optimal combination of media.

== Treatment ==
Single-dose antibiotic treatments using macrolides, third-generation cephalosporins, or fluoroquinolone continue to be effective in treating chancroid. The first line treatments recommended by the U.S. Centers for Disease Control and Prevention are one of four options: azithromycin one gram orally in a single dose, ceftriaxone 250 mg intramuscularly in a single dose, ciprofloxacin 500 mg orally two times a day for three days, or erythromycin base 500 mg orally three times a day for seven days. Some antibodies were specific to all strains, while others targeted only certain groups of strains of H. ducreyi, indicating that the outer membrane proteins of H. ducreyi can vary in their immune recognition. Infected individuals are still susceptible to reinfection due to the absence of developed protective immunity.

A rise in antimicrobial resistance among H. ducreyi strains result in a shift away from benzylpenicillin as the preferred treatment.

== See also ==
- Sexually transmitted disease
