= Klebsiella granulomatis =

Scientific classification
- Domain: Bacteria
- Kingdom: Pseudomonadati
- Phylum: Pseudomonadota
- Class: Gammaproteobacteria
- Order: Enterobacterales
- Family: Enterobacteriaceae
- Genus: Klebsiella
- Species: K. granulomatis

Binomial name
- Klebsiella granulomatis (Aragão and Vianna 1913) Carter et al. 1999

Species of bacterium

Klebsiella granulomatis is a Gram-negative, rod-shaped bacterium of the genus Klebsiella known to cause the sexually transmitted infection granuloma inguinale (or donovanosis). It was formerly called Calymmatobacterium granulomatis.

K. granulomatis is aerobic and non-motile. Cells are rod shaped measuring 0.5 to 2.0 μm. It is biochemically characterised by being as catalase-positive, phenylalanine deaminase-negative, citrate test-positive, and urease-positive. Among its virulence factors are its capsule, endotoxins, siderophores, antimicrobial resistance and antigenic phase variation.

== Incubation period ==
The incubation period lasts around 50 days, may vary between 1 and 12 weeks.

== Epidemiology ==
This rare form of genital ulceration is on the verge of being eradicated worldwide. There are currently alarming figures in areas such as India, Papua New Guinea, the Caribbean, South America, Zambia, Zimbabwe, South Africa and Australia.

Thanks to the recognition as a public health problem and appropriate control measures such as the implementation of better health service provisions, the incidence of this microorganism in countries such as Papua New Guinea, South Africa, India and the Caribbean has decreased significantly.
