= Aldehyde dehydrogenase 3 family, member A1 =

Protein-coding gene in the species Homo sapiens

ALDH3A1

Identifiers
- Aliases: ALDH3A1, ALDH3, ALDHIII, aldehyde dehydrogenase 3 family member A1, Aldehyde dehydrogenase 3 family, member A1
- External IDs: OMIM: 100660; MGI: 1353451; GeneCards: ALDH3A1
Available structures
| PDB | Ortholog search: PDBe RCSB |
| PDB | List of PDB id codes 3SZA, 3SZB, 4H80, 4L1O, 4L2O |
Enzyme activity
| EC # | BRENDA | ExPASy | KEGG | MetaCyc |
|---|---|---|---|---|
| 1.2.1.5 | ↗ | ↗ | ↗ | ↗ |

Gene location (Human)
| Chr. | Chromosome 17 (human) |
| Band | 17p11.2 | Start | 19,737,984 bp |
| Band | 17p11.2 | End | 19,748,943 bp |

Gene location (Mouse)
| Chr. | Chromosome 11 (mouse) |
| Band | 11 B2|11 37.96 cM | Start | 61,098,363 bp |
| Band | 11 B2|11 37.96 cM | End | 61,109,247 bp |
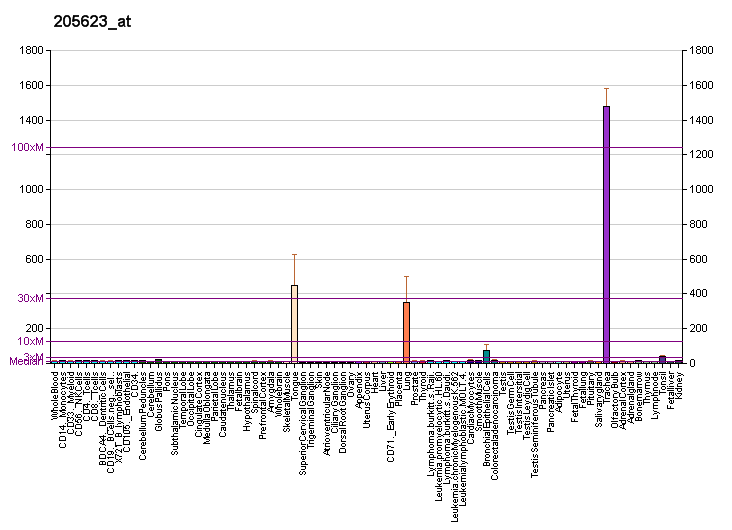
RNA expression pattern
| Bgee | Human / Mouse (ortholog); Top expressed in: nasal epithelium; trachea; olfactory zone of nasal mucosa; mucosa of pharynx; gums; gingival epithelium; oral cavity; bronchus; gastric mucosa; epithelium of bronchus / Top expressed in: corneal stroma; superior surface of tongue; esophagus; conjunctival fornix; epithelium of stomach; lip; epithelium of lens; ciliary body; mucous cell of stomach; pyloric antrum; More reference expression data |
| BioGPS | More reference expression data |
Gene ontology
| Molecular function | benzaldehyde dehydrogenase (NAD+) activity; oxidoreductase activity, acting on the aldehyde or oxo group of donors, NAD or NADP as acceptor; protein binding; oxidoreductase activity; aldehyde dehydrogenase (NAD+) activity; alcohol dehydrogenase (NADP+) activity; aldehyde dehydrogenase [NAD(P)+ activity]; 3-chloroallyl aldehyde dehydrogenase activity |
| Cellular component | integral component of membrane; plasma membrane; endoplasmic reticulum; extracellular space; cytoplasm; cytosol; nucleoplasm; intracellular membrane-bounded organelle |
| Biological process | response to hypoxia; response to organic cyclic compound; response to nutrient; ageing; response to glucocorticoid; cellular aldehyde metabolic process; positive regulation of cell population proliferation; xenobiotic metabolic process; metabolism; response to cAMP |
Sources:Amigo / QuickGO
Orthologs
| Databases | NCBI: entry; OMA: entry |
| Species | Human | Mouse |
| Entrez | 218 | 11670 |
| Ensembl | ENSG00000108602 | ENSMUSG00000019102 |
| UniProt | P30838 | P47739 |
| RefSeq (mRNA) | NM_000691; NM_001135167; NM_001135168; NM_001330150 | NM_001112725; NM_007436; NM_001331112 |
| RefSeq (protein) | NP_000682; NP_001128639; NP_001128640; NP_001317079 | NP_001106196; NP_001318041; NP_031462 |
| Location (UCSC) | Chr 17: 19.74 – 19.75 Mb | Chr 11: 61.1 – 61.11 Mb |
| PubMed search |
- Wikidata
| View/Edit Human | View/Edit Mouse |

Aldehyde dehydrogenase, dimeric NADP-preferring is an enzyme that in humans is encoded by the ALDH3A1 gene.

Aldehyde dehydrogenases oxidize various aldehydes to the corresponding acids. They are involved in the detoxification of alcohol-derived acetaldehyde and in the metabolism of corticosteroids, biogenic amines, neurotransmitters, and lipid peroxidation. The enzyme encoded by this gene forms a cytoplasmic homodimer that preferentially oxidizes aromatic aldehyde substrates. The gene is located within the Smith–Magenis syndrome region on chromosome 17.

ALDH3A1 expression is notably high in the cornea of mammalian species, comprising from 5 to 50% of soluble protein content, but is almost absent from the cornea of other vertebrates.

== Structure and mechanism ==
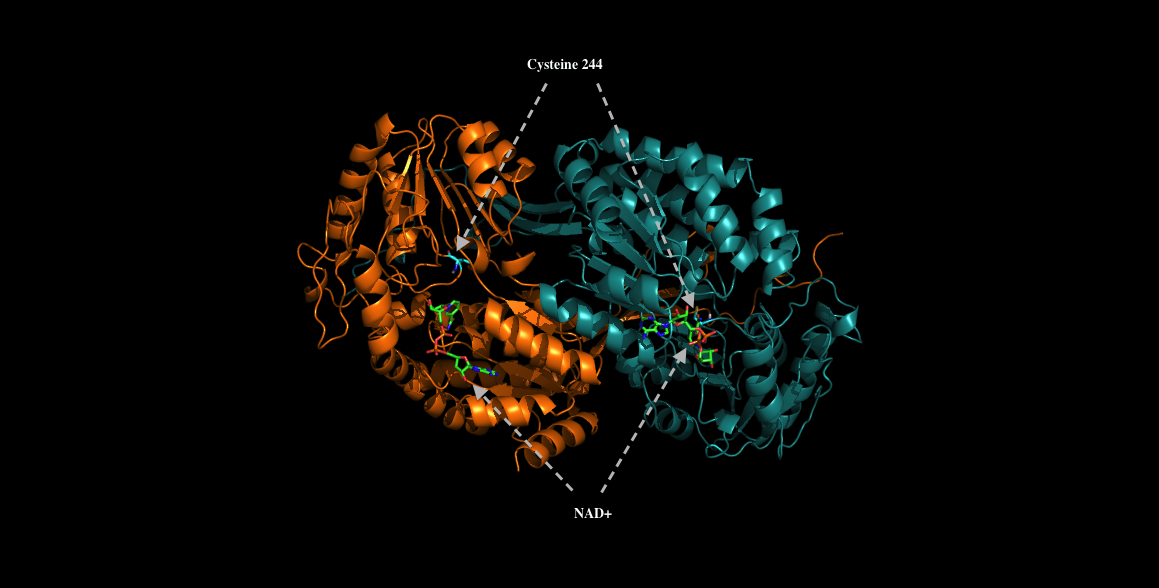
ALDH3A1 bound to NAD+

ALDH3A1 is a homodimer consisting of alpha helices (43.8%), beta sheets (4.2%), p-loop turns (28.2%) and random coils (23.8%). The catalytic residue–Cys244—is located on an active site that contains a Rossmann fold that binds the enzyme's cofactor, NAD(P)+.

ALDH3A1's catalytic mechanism mirrors that of other enzymes of the aldehyde dehydrogenase family. The sulfur atom of Cys244 attacks the carbonyl of the aldehyde substrate in a nucleophilic attack that releases a hydride ion. The hydride ion is accepted by the NAD(P)+ bound to the Rossmann fold. Unique interactions between the cofactor and the Rossmann fold facilitate an isomerization of the enzyme that releases the cofactor while maintaining the integrity of the active site. A water molecule enters the active site and is subsequently activated by a glutamate residue. The activated water then attacks the thioester enzyme-substrate complex in nucleophilic reaction that regenerates the free enzyme, and releases the corresponding carboxylic acid.

== Involvement in lipid peroxidation ==
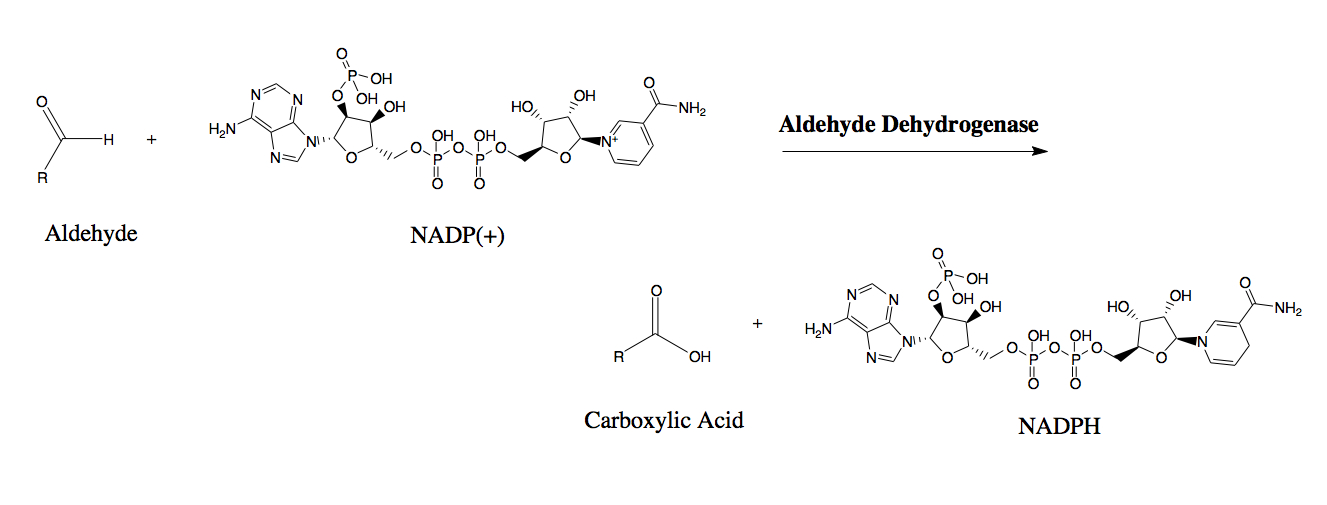
Stoichiometric equation representing the metabolism of an aldehyde substrate by ALDH3A1 using NADP+ as a cofactor

Electronic excitations of alkene and aromatic functional groups allow certain nucleic acids, proteins, fatty acids and organic molecules to absorb ultraviolet radiation (UVR). Moderate UVR exposure oxidizes specific proteins that eventually serve as signaling agents for an array of metabolic and inflammatory pathways. Overexposure to UVR, on the other hand, can be detrimental to the tissue. In the presence of molecular oxygen, UVR leads to the formation of reactive oxygen species (ROS) that are implicated in many degradation pathways. In the case of lipid peroxidation, ROS react with polyunsaturated fatty acids situated in the lipid bilayer of the cell membrane to produce lipid radicals. These lipid radicals propagate, further damaging the lipid bilayer and producing lipid hydroperoxides. The eventual degradation of lipid hydroperoxides releases a wide variety of aldehydes, which, owing to their stability and ability to react cellular nucleophiles, are both cytotoxic and genotoxic in nature. ALDH3A1 plays a critical role in the metabolism of these aldehydes to their corresponding carboxylic acids in mammalian cornea and saliva. 4-Hydroxynonenal (4HNE)—which ALDH3A1 metabolizes with V_{max} of 27,754 moles NADPH/min•mg and an apparent K_{m} of 362 micromolar —is the most abundant aldehyde produced in the LPO of arachidonic acid and linoleic acid. Its stability and multiple sites of reactivity (carbon-carbon double bond, hydroxyl group, and carbonyl) make 4HNE a potent inhibitor of cellular growth, enzyme activities, calcium sequestration, and protein synthesis. It is also involved in the consumption of glutathione and the alteration of signal transduction and gene expression.

== Role in the cornea ==
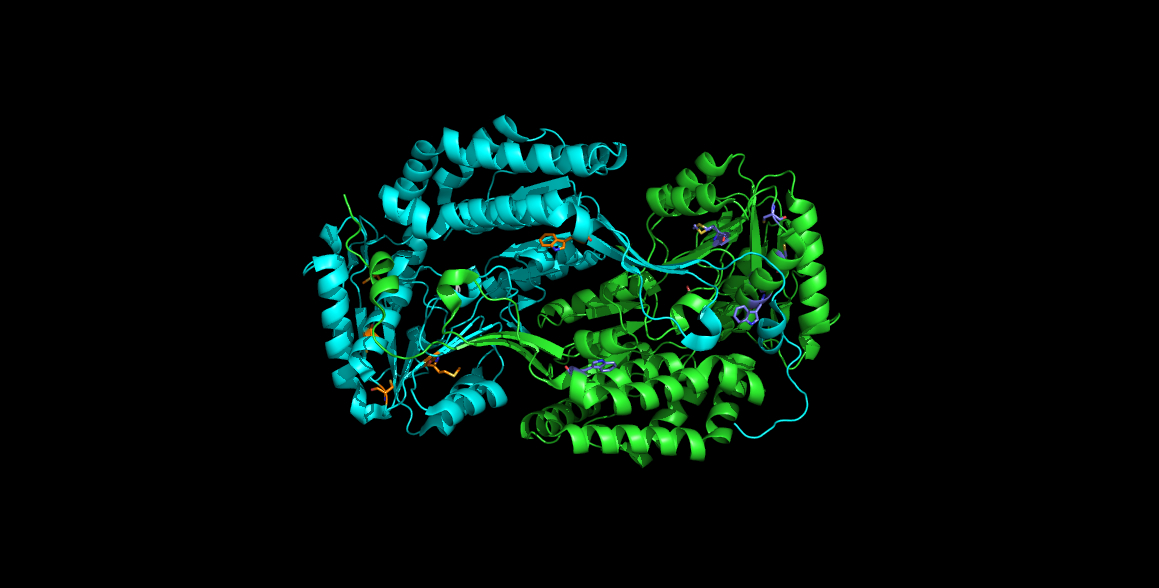
Structure showing the amino acid residues that degrade under UVR exposure. Shown are Tryptophan-81, Cysteine-223, Cysteine-229, Tryptophan-234, Methionine-295 and Methionine-366

ALDH3A1 comprises approximately 10-40% of the water-soluble protein in the mammalian cornea. Direct exposure to UVR and molecular oxygen, make the cornea susceptible to ROS and 4HNE. Studies in which rabbits were transfected with genes that allow them to overexpress human ALDH3A1 in their corneal stromal fibroblasts document ALDH3A1's most critical function is to protect the cornea from oxidative stresses. In the cornea ALDH3A1: (1) prevents the formation of 4-HNE protein adducts that would impeded proteins' function; (2) is more effective at metabolizing 4-HNE than other comparable agents such as glutathione (GSH); (3) protects the corneal cells from 4-HNE induced apoptosis; (4) reduces consumption of GSH by relieving 4HNE GSH adducts; (5) and relieves 4-HNE's inhibition of the 20S protease activity.

=== Suicide response to UVR ===
However, only a fraction of the total concentration of ALDH3A1 in the cornea is used for metabolizing aldehydes. This observation has sparked multiple investigations of ALDH3A1's role beyond aldehyde metabolism. Although the full scope of ALDH3A1's function is yet to be firmly established, there is strong evidence suggesting that ALDH3A1 serves to maintain the cellular redox balance as well as the structural integrity and transparency of the cornea. One study elucidates that ALDH3A1 not only indirectly protects the cornea from UVR induced oxidative stress by metabolizing aldehydes, but also protects the tissue directly, by competitively absorbing UVR in a "suicide response" that reduces damage to other proteins of the cornea In fact, 50% percent of the UVR that the cornea is exposed to is absorbed by ADLH3A1. ALDH3A1's absorption of UVR oxidizes several key amino acid residues, leading to conformational changes that convert the alpha and beta sheets into random coils. These conformational changes ultimately relieve the dimer structure. This loss of secondary and tertiary structure leads to protein aggregation and complete loss of enzymatic activity. Peptide mapping and spectroscopic experiments reveal that the loss of activity is not a result of Cys244 oxidation (which, together with the active site, remains intact during photo-excitation), but instead, due to the degradation of other key amino residues (most notably methionine and tryptophan). These amino acid residues degrade under oxidative stress, leading to the formation of non-reducible cross-links that stabilize the soluble aggregates. Tryptophan for instance is doubly oxidized to generate ROSs such as H_{2}O_{2}, which elicit further oxidation and adduction. Nevertheless, the abundance of ALDH3A1 in the cornea ensures that this suicide response neither impedes with aldehyde metabolism nor leads to the formation of insoluble aggregates that would affect the transparency of the cornea.

Cataract in human eye

=== Consequences of ALDH3A1 deficiency ===
Further clarification of ALDH3A1's role in the cornea has been provided by gene-knockout studies in which genes encoding ALDH3A1 were removed from the mice genome. It was found that ALDH3A1-null mice exhibited lower proteasome activity, higher rates of protein degradation/oxidation, and higher GSH, 4HNE and malondialdehyde protein adduct levels—all of which contributed to the development of cataracts and opacities in the subscapular regions of the cornea within one month of age. These observations on ALDH3A1-null mice reaffirm that ALDH3A1's role extends beyond enzymatic metabolism; encompassing functions in maintenance of the structural integrity and transparency of the cornea.
