= Aldehyde dehydrogenase =

Group of enzymes

Aldehyde dehydrogenase (NAD+)
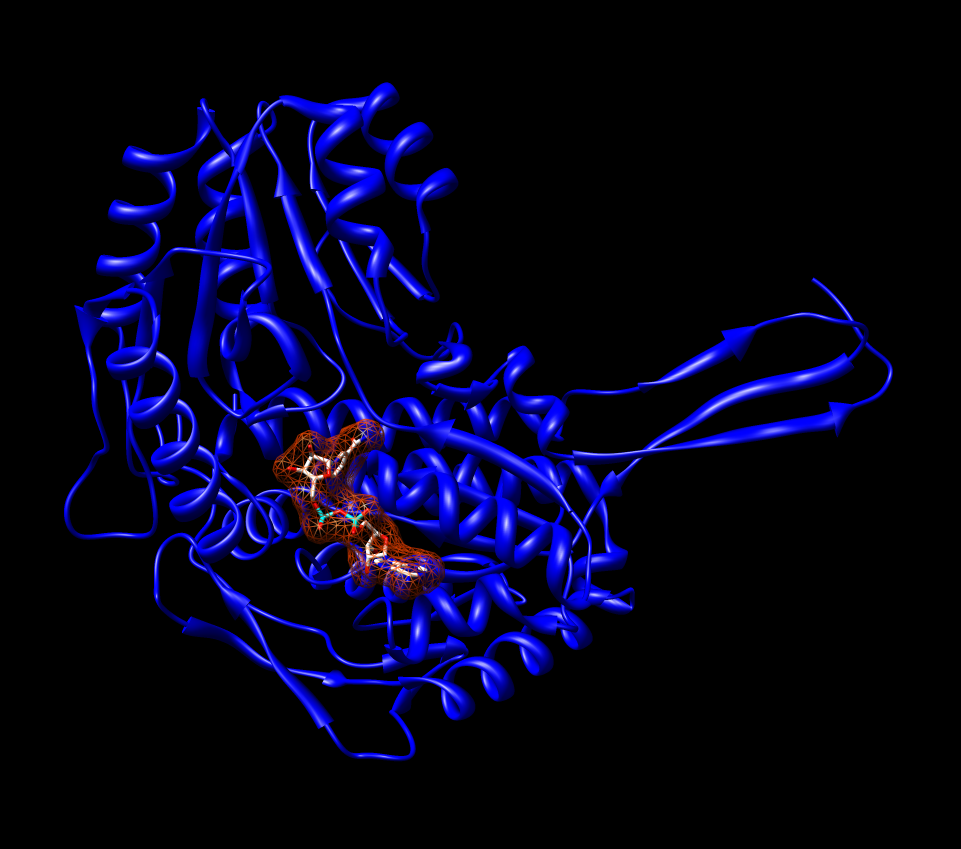
- Monomer of human aldehyde dehydrogenase 2 (ALDH2) with a space-filling model of NAD+ in the active site.

Identifiers
- EC no.: 1.2.1.3
- CAS no.: 9028-86-8

Databases
- IntEnz: IntEnz view
- BRENDA: BRENDA entry
- ExPASy: NiceZyme view
- KEGG: KEGG entry
- MetaCyc: metabolic pathway
- PRIAM: profile
- PDB structures: RCSB PDB PDBe PDBsum
- Gene Ontology: AmiGO / QuickGO
Search
- PMC: articles
- PubMed: articles
- NCBI: proteins

Aldehyde dehydrogenases (EC 1.2.1.3) are a group of enzymes that catalyse the oxidation of aldehydes. They convert aldehydes (R–C(=O)–H) to carboxylic acids (R–C(=O)–O–H). The oxygen comes from a water molecule. To date, nineteen ALDH genes have been identified within the human genome. These genes participate in a wide variety of biological processes including the detoxification of exogenously and endogenously generated aldehydes.

== Function ==
Aldehyde dehydrogenase is a polymorphic enzyme responsible for the oxidation of aldehydes to carboxylic acids. The location of the enzyme and primary type of aldehyde acted on depend on the specific gene/protein. For example, members of the ALDH1A subfamily rest in the cytosol and preferentially act on retinaldehyde, while ALDH2 exists in the mitochondria and preferentially acts on acetaldehyde (with no activity towards retinaldehyde). However, each ALDH enzyme can often act on multiple substrates, with for example ALDH1A1, ALDH2, ALDH3A1, and ALDH4A1 being able to also function as esterases.

Older classifications broke the family into three different mammalian classes: class 1 (low acetaldehyde affinity, cytosolic), class 2 (low acetaldehyde affinity, mitochondrial), and class 3 (high acetaldehyde affinity, such as those expressed in tumors, stomach, and cornea). However, more recent groupings (reflected in the gene symbols) are based on sequence similarity and phylogeny in addition to structural features.

== Active site ==
The active site of the aldehyde dehydrogenase enzyme is largely conserved throughout the different classes of the enzyme and, although the number of amino acids present in a subunit can change, the overall function of the site changes little. The active site binds to one molecule of an aldehyde and one molecule of either NAD^{+} or NADP^{+}, which functions as a cofactor. Cysteine and glutamate molecules interact with the aldehyde substrate. Many other residues will interact with NAD(P)^{+} to hold it in place. Magnesium may be used to help the enzyme function, although the degree to which magnesium assists the enzyme varies between different classes of aldehydes.

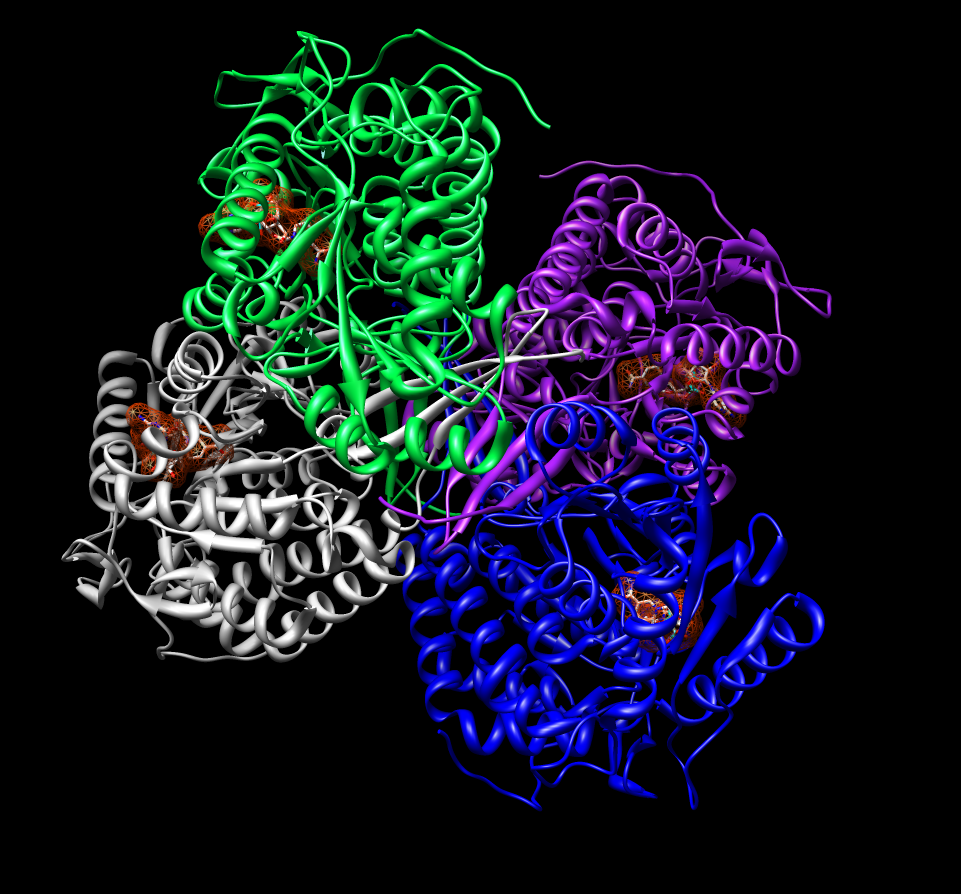
Tetramer of aldehyde dehydrogenase 2 with a space filling model of NAD^{+} in each active site.

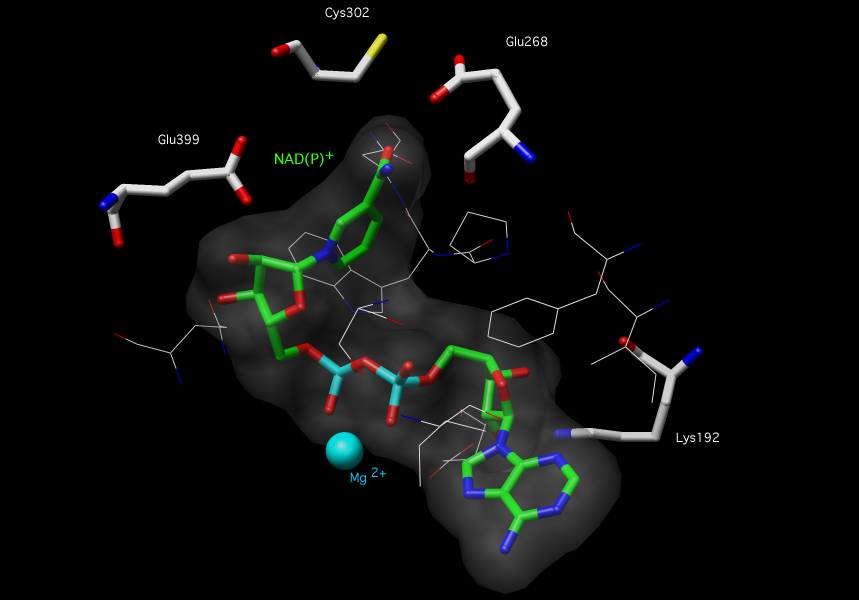
The active site of a human mitochondrial aldehyde dehydrogenase 2. Cys302 and Glu268 interact with the aldehyde substrate. The NAD^{+} is held in place by multiple residues (shown as wires or sticks).

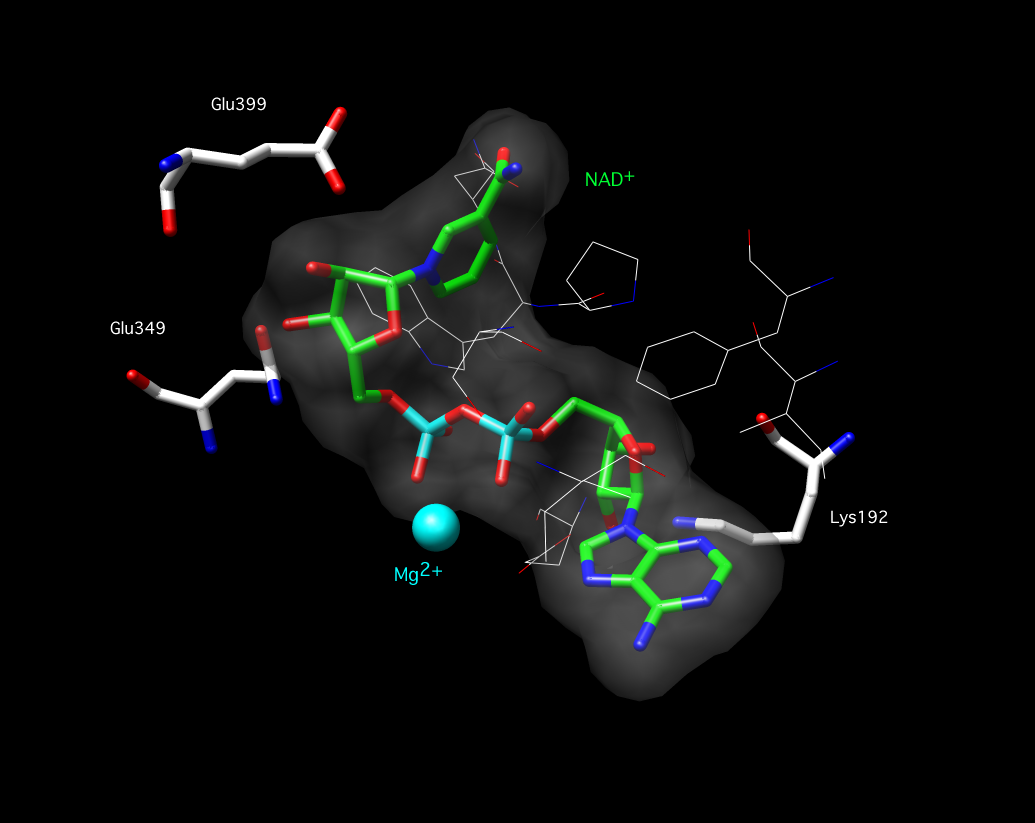
The active site of the K487E mutant aldehyde dehydrogenase 2 with a space-filling model of NAD^{+} in the active site. The amino acid Glu349 is highlighted.

== Mechanism ==
The overall reaction catalysed by the aldehyde dehydrogenases is:

- RCHO + NAD^{+} + H_{2}O → RCOOH + NADH + H^{+}

In this NAD(P)^{+}-dependent reaction, the aldehyde enters the active site through a channel extending from the surface of the enzyme. The active site contains a Rossmann fold, and interactions between the cofactor and the fold allow for the action of the active site.

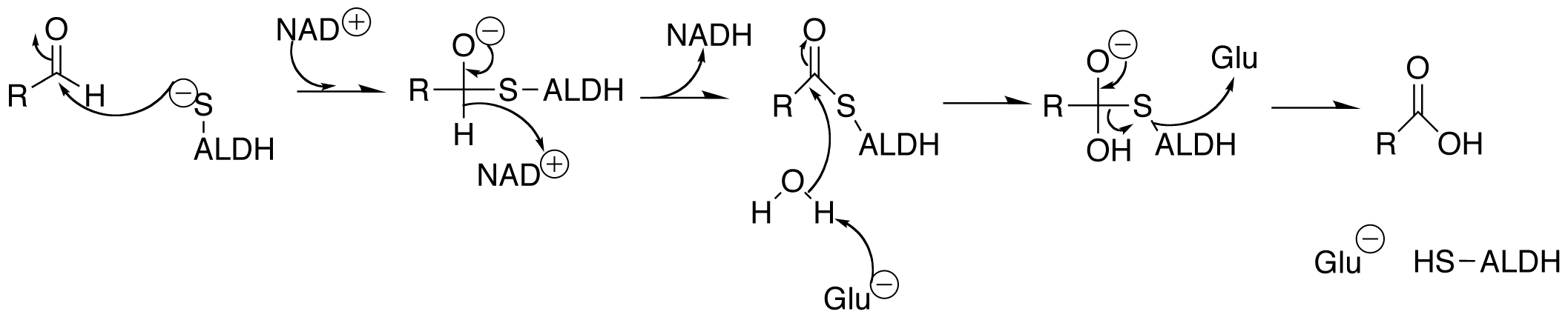
Mechanism of Aldehyde Dehydrogenase

A sulfur from a cysteine in the active site makes a nucleophilic attack on the carbonyl carbon of the aldehyde. The hydrogen is kicked off as a hydride and attacks NAD(P)^{+} to make NAD(P)H. The enzyme's active site then goes through an isomorphic change whereby the NAD(P)H is moved, creating room for a water molecule to access the substrate. The water is primed by a glutamate in the active site, and the water makes a nucleophilic attack on the carbonyl carbon, kicking off the sulfur as a leaving group.

Researchers at the University of Tsukuba found that durian extract inhibited aldehyde dehydrogenase activity, lending credence to an Asian folklore warning against consuming durian with alcohol.

== Acetaldehyde Dehydrogenases ==
The subset of aldehyde dehydrogenases that convert acetaldehyde into acetate are often referred to as Acetaldehyde Dehydrogenases (not to be confused with the acetylating acetaldehyde dehydrogenase enzymes involved in bacterial fermentation). There are three known genes which encode this enzymatic activity in humans, ALDH1A1, ALDH2, and the more recently discovered ALDH1B1 (previously known as ALDH5). These enzymes have an important role in the metabolism of alcohol.

In the liver, ethanol is converted into acetate by a two step process. In the first step, ethanol is converted to acetaldehyde by alcohol dehydrogenase. In the second step, the acetaldehyde is converted to acetate by acetaldehyde dehydrogenase. Acetaldehyde is more toxic than alcohol and is responsible for many hangover symptoms.

=== Comparison of Isozymes ===
ALDH2, which has a lower K_{M} for acetaldehydes than ALDH1A1 and acts predominantly in the mitochondrial matrix, is the main enzyme in acetaldehyde metabolism. Unlike ALDH2, ALDH1A1 is primarily located in the cytosol, and is also involved in the metabolism of Vitamin A. Because of the difference in cellular location of these two enzymes, earlier texts sometimes referred to ALDH2 as “mitochondrial acetaldehyde dehydrogenase”, but this terminology was complicated by the fact that the later discovered ALDH1B1 is also primarily located in the mitochondria.

Although ALDH1A1 and ALDH2 do not share a common subunit, the homology between the human ALDH1A1 and ALDH2 proteins is 66% at the coding nucleotide level and 69% at the amino acid level, which is found to be lower than the 91% homology between human ALDH1A1 and horse ALDH1A1. Such a finding is consistent with evidence suggesting the early evolutionary divergence between cytosolic and mitochondrial isozymes, as seen in the 50% homology between pig mitochondrial and cytosolic aspartate aminotransferases.

== Pathology (aldehyde dehydrogenase deficiency) ==
Role of aldehyde dehydrogenase (shown in red box) in norepinephrine degradation, creating vanillylmandelic acid, the major catecholamine metabolite.

$\ce{H}{-} \overset{\displaystyle \ce{H} \atop |}{\underset{| \atop \displaystyle \ce{H}}{\ce C}} {-} \overset{\displaystyle \ce{H} \atop |}{\underset{| \atop \displaystyle \ce{H}}{\ce C}} \ce{-O-H ->[\ce{ADH}] H}{-} \overset{\displaystyle \ce{H} \atop |}{\underset{| \atop \displaystyle \ce{H}}{\ce C}} {-} \overset{\displaystyle \ce{H} \atop |}{\underset{\| \atop \displaystyle \ce{O}}{\ce C}} \ce{->[\ce{ALDH}] H}{-} \overset{\displaystyle \ce{H} \atop |}{\underset{| \atop \displaystyle \ce{H}}{\ce C}} {-} \overset{\color{white}{\displaystyle \ce{H} \atop |}}{\underset{\| \atop \displaystyle \ce{O}}{\ce C}} \ce{-O-H}$
Metabolism of alcohol (ethanol) to acetaldehyde (ethanal)
and then to acetic acid (ethanoic acid)

ALDH2 plays a crucial role in maintaining low blood levels of acetaldehyde during alcohol oxidation. In this pathway (ethanol to acetaldehyde to acetate), the intermediate structures can be toxic, and health problems arise when those intermediates cannot be cleared. When high levels of acetaldehyde occur in the blood, facial flushing, lightheadedness, palpitations, nausea, and general "hangover" symptoms occur. It also is thought to be the cause of a medical condition known as the alcohol flush reaction, also known as "Asian flush" or "Oriental flushing syndrome".

There is a mutant form of aldehyde dehydrogenase, termed ALDH2*2, wherein a lysine residue replaces a glutamate in the active site at position 487 of ALDH2. Homozygous individuals with the mutant allele have almost no ALDH2 activity, and those heterozygous for the mutation have reduced activity. Thus, the mutation is partially dominant. The ineffective homozygous allele works at a rate of about 8% of the normal allele, for it shows a higher K_{m} for NAD^{+} and has a higher maximum velocity than the wild-type allele. This mutation is common in Japan, where 41% of a non-alcoholic control group were ALDH2 deficient, where only 2–5% of an alcoholic group were ALDH2-deficient. In Taiwan, the numbers are similar, with 30% of the control group showing the deficiency and 6% of alcoholics displaying it. The deficiency is manifested by slow acetaldehyde removal, with low alcohol tolerance perhaps leading to a lower frequency of alcoholism.

These symptoms are the same as those observed in people who drink while being treated by the drug disulfiram, which is why disulfiram is used to treat alcoholism. The patients show higher blood levels of acetaldehyde, and become violently ill upon consumption of even small amounts of alcohol. Several drugs (e.g., metronidazole) cause a similar reaction known as disulfiram-like reaction.

Yokoyama et al. found that decreased enzyme activity of aldehyde dehydrogenase-2, caused by the mutated ALDH2 allele, contributes to a higher chance of esophageal and oropharyngolaryngeal cancers. The metabolized acetaldehyde in the blood, which is six times higher than in individuals without the mutation, has shown to be a carcinogen in lab animals. ALDH2*2 is associated with increased odds of oropharyngolaryngeal, esophageal, gastric, colon, and lung cancer. However, they found no connection between increased levels of ALDH2*2 in the blood and an increased risk of liver cancer.

High expression of the genes that encode ALDH1A1 and ALDH2 is associated with a poor prognosis in patients with acute myeloid leukemia.

Demir et al. found that ALDH1A1 is a potentially important, poor prognostic factor in breast cancer, associated with high histological grade, estrogen/progesterone receptor negativity and HER2 positivity.

Some case-control studies claimed that carriage of ALDH2*2 allele was a risk of late-onset Alzheimer's disease independent of the apolipoprotein E gene (the odds for LOAD in carriers of ALDH2*2 allele almost twice that of non-carriers). Moreover, ALDH gene, protein expression and activity are substantially decreased in the substantia nigra of Parkinson's disease patients. These reports are in line with findings implementing toxic lipid oxidation-derived aldehydes in these diseases and in neurodegeneration in general.

Fitzmaurice et al. explored aldehyde dehydrogenase inhibition as a pathogenic mechanism in Parkinson disease. "This ALDH model for PD etiology may help explain the selective vulnerability of dopaminergic neurons in PD and provide a potential mechanism through which environmental toxicants contribute to PD pathogenesis."

Knockout mouse models further confirm the involvement of ALDH family in neurodegeneration. Mice null for ALDH1A1 and ALDH2 exhibit Parkinson's disease-like age-dependent deficits in motor performance and significant increase in biogenic aldehydes.

The ALDH2-/- mice display age-related memory deficits in various tasks, as well as endothelial dysfunction, brain atrophy, and other Alzheimer's disease-associated pathologies, including marked increases in lipid peroxidation products, amyloid-beta, p-tau and activated caspases. These behavioral and biochemical Alzheimer's disease-like deficits were efficiently ameliorated when the ALDH2-/- mice were treated with isotope-reinforced, deuterated polyunsaturated fatty acids (D-PUFA).

== Drug Interactions ==
The drug disulfiram (Antabuse) prevents the oxidation of acetaldehyde to acetic acid and is used in the treatment of alcoholism. ALDH1A1 is strongly inhibited by disulfiram, while ALDH2 is resistant to its effect. The cysteine residue at 302 in ALDH1A1 and 200 in ALDH2 is implicated as a disulfiram binding site on the enzyme and serves as a disulfiram sensitive thiol site. Covalent binding of disulfiram to the thiol blocks the binding of one of the cysteine residues with iodoacetamide, thereby inactivating the enzyme and significantly lowering catalytic activity. Activity can be recovered by treatment with 2-mercaptoethanol, although not with glutathione.

Metronidazole (Flagyl), which is used to treat certain parasitic infections as well as pseudomembranous colitis, causes similar effects to disulfiram. Coprine (which is an amino acid found in certain coprinoid mushrooms) metabolizes in vivo to 1-aminocyclopropanol which causes similar effects as well.

== Genes ==
- ALDH1A1, ALDH1A2, ALDH1A3, ALDH1B1, ALDH1L1, ALDH1L2
- ALDH2
- ALDH3A1, ALDH3A2, ALDH3B1, ALDH3B2
- ALDH4A1, ALDH5A1, ALDH6A1, ALDH7A1, ALDH8A1, ALDH9A1, ALDH16A1, ALDH18A1

== See also ==
- Alcohol dehydrogenase
- Disulfiram-like drug
