= C20H16 =

The molecular formula C_{20}H_{16} (molar mass: 256.34 g/mol) may refer to:

- 7,12-Dimethylbenz[a]anthracene (DMBA)
- Triphenylethylene
