= Interosseous muscles of the foot =

Foot muscles

Details
- Origin: Dorsal: Adjacent sides of 1st through 5th metatarsals. Plantar: Bases and medial sides of 3rd through 5th metatarsals.
- Insertion: Dorsal: 1st = medial side of proximal phalanx of 2nd digit; 2nd through 4th = lateral sides of digits 2-4. Plantar: Medial sides of bases of proximal phalanges of 3rd through 5th digits.
- Artery: Dorsal: Arcuate artery, dorsal and plantar metatarsal arteries. Plantar: Lateral plantar artery and plantar arch, plantar metatarsal and plantar digital arteries.
- Nerve: Lateral plantar nerve
- Actions: Dorsal: Abducts 2nd through 4th toes, flex metatarsophalangeal joints, and extend phalanges. Plantar: Adduct digits (2-4) and flex metatarsophalangeal joint and extend phalanges.

The interosseous muscles of the foot are muscles found near the metatarsal bones that help to control the toes. They are considered voluntary muscles.

They are generally divided into two sets:

- 4 Dorsal interossei - Abduct the digits away from the 2nd digit (away from axial line) and are bipennate.
- 3 Plantar interossei - Adduct the digits towards the 2nd digit (towards the axial line) and are unipennate.

The axial line goes down the middle of the 2nd digit, towards the sole of the foot (it's an imaginary line).

Both sets of muscles are innervated by the lateral plantar nerve.
