= M1G =

M_{1}G
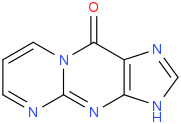

Names
- IUPAC name Pyrimido[1,2-a]purin-10(3H)-one

Identifiers
| CAS Number | 103408-45-3 |
| 3D model (JSmol) | Interactive image |
| ChemSpider | 110673 |
| MeSH | C107643 |
| PubChem CID | 124218 |
| UNII | M1G1G9A3TZ |
| CompTox Dashboard (EPA) | DTXSID60145820 |
- InChI: InChI=1S/C8H5N5O/c14-7-5-6(11-4-10-5)12-8-9-2-1-3-13(7)8/h1-4H,(H,10,11) Key: ZREGNVKUSNORFO-UHFFFAOYSA-N; InChI=1/C8H5N5O/c14-7-5-6(11-4-10-5)12-8-9-2-1-3-13(7)8/h1-4H,(H,10,11) Key: ZREGNVKUSNORFO-UHFFFAOYAI
- SMILES: C1=CN2C(=O)C3=C(N=CN3)N=C2N=C1

Properties
| Chemical formula | C_{8}H_{5}N_{5}O |
| Molar mass | 187.162 g·mol^{−1} |
- Except where otherwise noted, data are given for materials in their standard state (at 25 °C [77 °F], 100 kPa). verify (what is ?) Infobox references

M_{1}G (pyrimido[1,2-a]purin-10(3H)-one) is a heterocyclic compound which is a by-product of base excision repair (BER) of a specific type of DNA adduct called M_{1}dG. The M_{1}dG adduct in turn is formed by a condensation reaction between guanosine nucleotides in DNA and either malondialdehyde (propanedial) or acrolein. If not repaired, these adducts are mutagenic and carcinogenic.

Malondialdehyde is an end product of lipid peroxidation while acrolein is a result of DNA peroxidation.

M_{1}dG is the major endogenous DNA adduct in humans. M_{1}dG adducts have been detected in cell DNA in liver, leucocytes, pancreas and breast in concentrations of 1-120 per 10^{8} nucleotides. Detection and quantification of M_{1}dG adducts in the body as measured by free M_{1}G is a tool for detecting DNA damage that may lead to cancer. Free M_{1}G is also biomarker for oxidative stress.
