= 4-Hydroxynonenal =

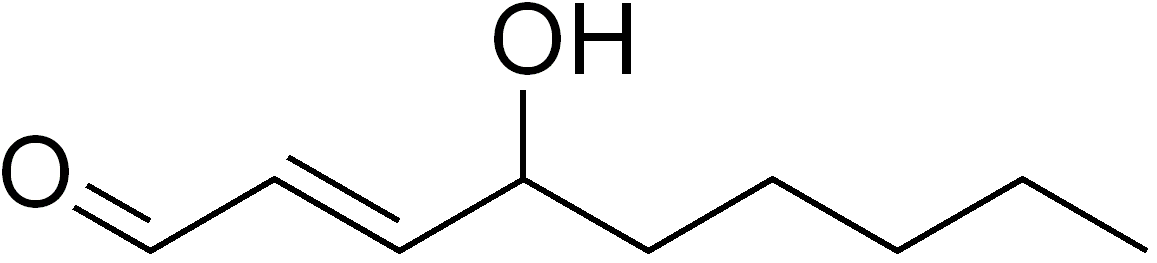
- Skeletal formula of 4-hydroxynonenal ((2E)-2-en)

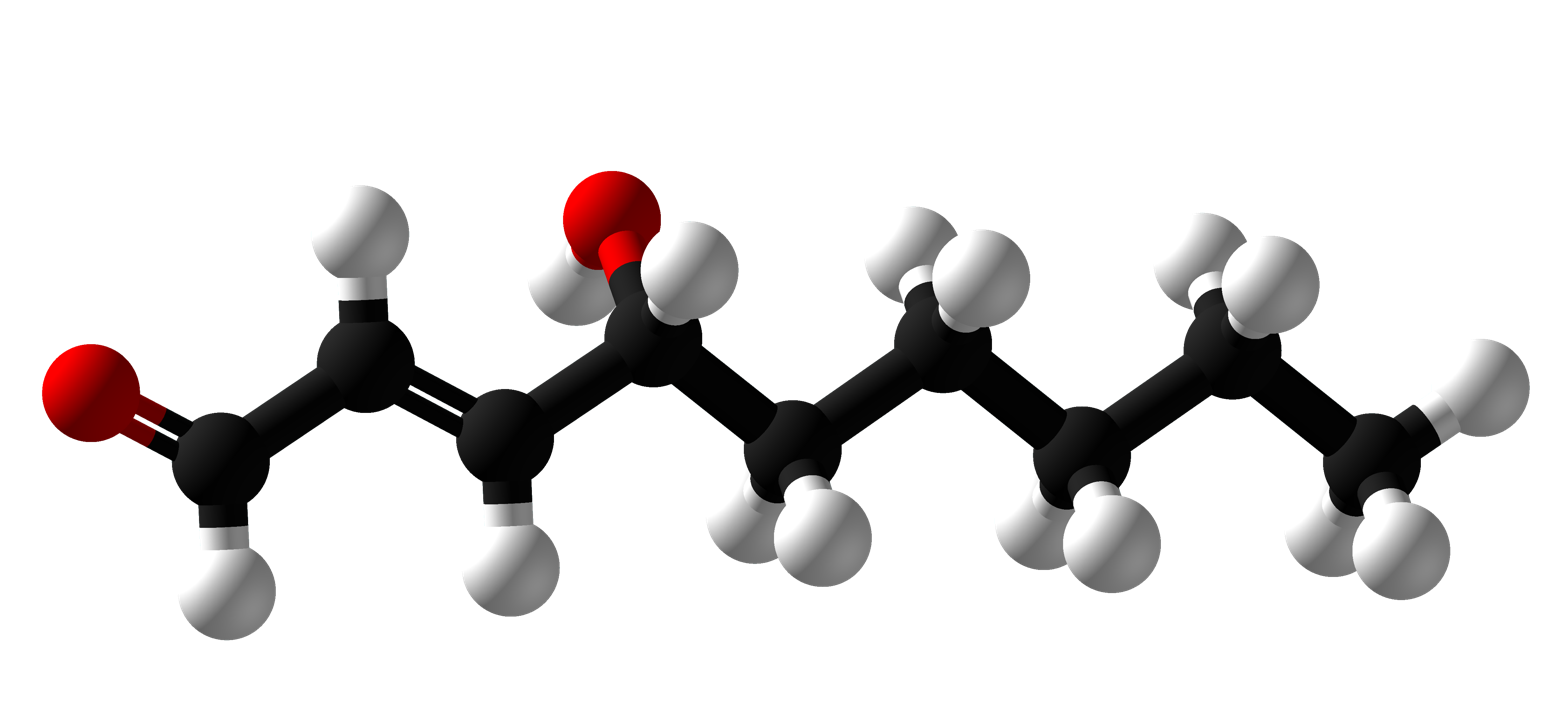

Names
- Preferred IUPAC name 4-Hydroxynon-2-enal
- Other names 4-Hydroxy-2-nonenal

Identifiers
CAS Number	75899-68-2 (2E)
3D model (JSmol)	Interactive image
Beilstein Reference	4660015 (2E,4R)
ChEBI	CHEBI:32585
ChEMBL	ChEMBL454280
ChemSpider	1630 (2Z); 4446465 (2E); 10131680 (2E,4R)
IUPHAR/BPS	6274
MeSH	4-hydroxy-2-nonenal
PubChem CID	1693; 6433714 (2Z); 5283344 (2E); 11957428 (2E,4R)
UNII	K1CVM13F96
CompTox Dashboard (EPA)	DTXSID4040395
- InChI: InChI=1S/C9H16O2/c1-2-3-4-6-9(11)7-5-8-10/h5,7-9,11H,2-4,6H2,1H3/b7-5+ Key: JVJFIQYAHPMBBX-FNORWQNLSA-N; InChI=1/C9H16O2/c1-2-3-4-6-9(11)7-5-8-10/h5,7-9,11H,2-4,6H2,1H3/b7-5+ Key: JVJFIQYAHPMBBX-FNORWQNLBE
- SMILES: CCCCCC(O)C=CC=O

Properties
Chemical formula	C_{9}H_{16}O_{2}
Molar mass	156.225 g·mol^{−1}
Density	0.944 g⋅cm^{−3}
Boiling point	125–127 °C (257–261 °F; 398–400 K) 2 torr
log P	1.897
Acidity (pK_{a})	13.314
Basicity (pK_{b})	0.683

Related compounds
Related alkenals	Glucic acid Malondialdehyde
- Except where otherwise noted, data are given for materials in their standard state (at 25 °C [77 °F], 100 kPa). verify (what is ?) Infobox references

4-Hydroxynonenal, or 4-hydroxy-2E-nonenal or 4-hydroxy-2-nonenal or 4-HNE or HNE, (C_{9}H_{16}O_{2}), is an α,β-unsaturated hydroxyalkenal that is produced by lipid peroxidation in cells. 4-HNE is the primary α,β-unsaturated hydroxyalkenal formed in this process. It is a colorless oil. It is found throughout animal tissues, and in higher quantities during oxidative stress due to the increase in the lipid peroxidation chain reaction, due to the increase in stress events. 4-HNE has been hypothesized to play a key role in cell signal transduction, in a variety of pathways from cell cycle events to cellular adhesion.

Early identification and characterization of 4-hydroxynonenal was reported by Esterbauer, et al., who also obtained the same compound synthetically. The topic has since been often reviewed, and one source describes the compound as "the most studied LPO (lipid peroxidation) product with pleiotropic capabilities".

== Synthesis ==
4-Hydroxynonenal is generated in the oxidation of lipids containing polyunsaturated omega-6 fatty acids, such as arachidonic and linoleic acids, and of their 15-lipoxygenase metabolites, namely 15-hydroperoxyeicosatetraenoic and 13-hydroperoxyoctadecadienoic acids. Although they are the most studied ones, in the same process other oxygenated α,β-unsaturated aldehydes (OαβUAs) are generated also, which can also come from omega-3 fatty acids, such as 4-oxo-trans-2-nonenal, 4-hydroxy-trans-2-hexenal, 4-hydroperoxy-trans-2-nonenal and 4,5-epoxy-trans-2-decenal.

== Protein adducts ==
4-HNE can attach to proteins via a Michael addition reaction, which can target cysteine, histidine or lysine, or through the formation of a Schiff base, which can target arginine or lysine.

The lysine adduct ((4-HNE)-lysine or 4-hydroxynonenallysine) has been referred to as an "oxidation-specific epitope" and a lipid oxidation "degradation product". It is generated by the oxidative modification of low-density lipoprotein through the direct addition of carbonyl groups from 4-HNE onto lysine.

== Pathology ==
These compounds can be produced in cells and tissues of living organisms or in foods during processing or storage, and from these latter can be absorbed through the diet. Since 1991, OαβUAs are receiving a great deal of attention because they are being considered as possible causal agents of numerous diseases, such as chronic inflammation, neurodegenerative diseases, adult respiratory distress syndrome, atherogenesis, diabetes and different types of cancer.

There seems to be a dual and hormetic action of 4-HNE on the health of cells: lower intracellular concentrations (around 0.1-5 micromolar) seem to be beneficial to cells, promoting proliferation, differentiation, antioxidant defense and compensatory mechanism, while higher concentrations (around 10-20 micromolar) have been shown to trigger well-known toxic pathways such as the induction of caspase enzymes, the laddering of genomic DNA, the release of cytochrome c from mitochondria, with the eventual outcome of cell death (through both apoptosis and necrosis, depending on concentration). HNE has been linked to the pathology of several diseases such as Alzheimer's disease, cataract, atherosclerosis, diabetes and cancer.

The increasing trend to enrich foods with polyunsaturated acyl groups entails the potential risk of enriching the food with some OαβUAs at the same time, as has already been detected in some studies carried out in 2007. PUFA-fortified foods available on the market have been increasing since epidemiological and clinical researches have revealed possible effects of PUFA on brain development and curative and/or preventive effects on cardiovascular disease. However, PUFA are very labile and easily oxidizable, thus the maximum beneficial effects of PUFA supplements may not be obtained if they contain significant amounts of toxic OαβUAs, which as commented on above, are being considered as possible causal agents of numerous diseases.

Special attention must also be paid to cooking oils used repeatedly in catering and households because in those processes very high amounts of OαβUAs are generated and they can be easily absorbed through the diet.

== Detoxification and related reactions ==
4-HNE has two reactive groups: the conjugated aldehyde and the C=C double-bond, and the hydroxy group at carbon 4. The α,β-unsaturated ketone serves as a Michael acceptor, adding thiols to give thioether adducts.

A small group of enzymes are specifically suited to the detoxification and removal of 4-HNE from cells. Within this group are the glutathione S-transferases (GSTs) such as hGSTA4-4 and hGST5.8, aldose reductase, and aldehyde dehydrogenase. These enzymes have low K_{m} values for HNE catalysis and together are very efficient at controlling the intracellular concentration, up to a critical threshold amount, at which these enzymes are overwhelmed and cell death is inevitable.

Glutathione S-transferases hGSTA4-4 and hGST5.8 catalyze the conjugation of glutathione peptides to 4-hydroxynonenal through a conjugate addition to the alpha-beta unsaturated carbonyl, forming a more water-soluble molecule, GS-HNE. While there are other GSTs capable of this conjugation reaction (notably in the alpha class), these other isoforms are much less efficient and their production is not induced by the stress events which cause the formation of 4-HNE (such as exposure to hydrogen peroxide, ultraviolet light, heat shock, cancer drugs, etc.), as the production of the more specific two isoforms is. This result strongly suggests that hGSTA4-4 and hGST5.8 are specifically adapted by human cells for the purpose of detoxifying 4-HNE to abrogate the downstream effects which such a buildup would cause.

Increased activity of the mitochondrial enzyme aldehyde dehydrogenase 2 (ALDH2) has been shown to have a protective effect against cardiac ischemia in animal models, and the postulated mechanism given by the investigators was 4-hydroxynonenal metabolism.

== Export ==
GS-HNE is a potent inhibitor of the activity of glutathione S-transferase, and therefore must be shuttled out of the cell to allow conjugation to occur at a physiological rate. Ral-interacting GTPase activating protein (RLIP76, also known as Ral-binding protein 1), is a membrane-bound protein which has high activity towards the transport of GS-HNE from the cytoplasm to the extracellular space. This protein accounts for approximately 70% of such transport in human cell lines, while the remainder appears to be accounted for by Multidrug Resistance Protein 1 (MRP1).
