= TBARS =

Thiobarbituric acid reactive substances

Thiobarbituric acid reactive substances (TBARS) are formed as a byproduct of lipid peroxidation (i.e. as degradation products of fats) which can be detected by the TBARS assay using thiobarbituric acid as a reagent. TBARS can be upregulated, for example, by heart attack or by certain kinds of stroke.

Because reactive oxygen species (ROS) have extremely short half-lives, they are difficult to measure directly. Instead, what can be measured are several products of the damage produced by oxidative stress, such as TBARS.

Assay of TBARS measures malondialdehyde (MDA) present in the sample, as well as malondialdehyde generated from lipid hydroperoxides by the hydrolytic conditions of the reaction. MDA is one of several low-molecular-weight end products formed via the decomposition of certain primary and secondary lipid peroxidation products. However, only certain lipid peroxidation products generate MDA, and MDA is neither the sole end product of fatty peroxide formation and decomposition, nor a substance generated exclusively through lipid peroxidation. These and other considerations from the extensive literature on MDA, TBA reactivity, and oxidative lipid degradation support the conclusion that MDA determination and the TBA test can offer, at best, a narrow and somewhat empirical window on the complex process of lipid peroxidation. Use of MDA analysis and/or the TBA test and interpretation of sample MDA content and TBA test response in studies of lipid peroxidation require caution, discretion, and (especially in biological systems) correlative data from other indices of fatty peroxide formation and decomposition.

Malondialdehyde reacts with both barbiturate and thiobarbiturate, and the end-product of the TBARS assay is almost identical to the end product of the pyridine-barbiturate cyanide assay. This suggests that some cyanide poisoning cases that relied on the pyridine-barbiturate diagnostic could be false positives with elevated blood malondialdehyde, and no cyanide present at all. The cases of Urooj Khan, lottery winner of Chicago, and Autumn Klein, doctor of Pittsburgh, both fit these characteristics, since neither patient exhibited cyanide poisoning symptoms, yet both appeared to have suffered heart attacks, with Urooj Khan's blocked arteries noted at autopsy and Autumn Klein's evidence for heart abnormalities noted at trial and as a central part of her husband's conviction appeal.
