= Thiobarbituric acid =

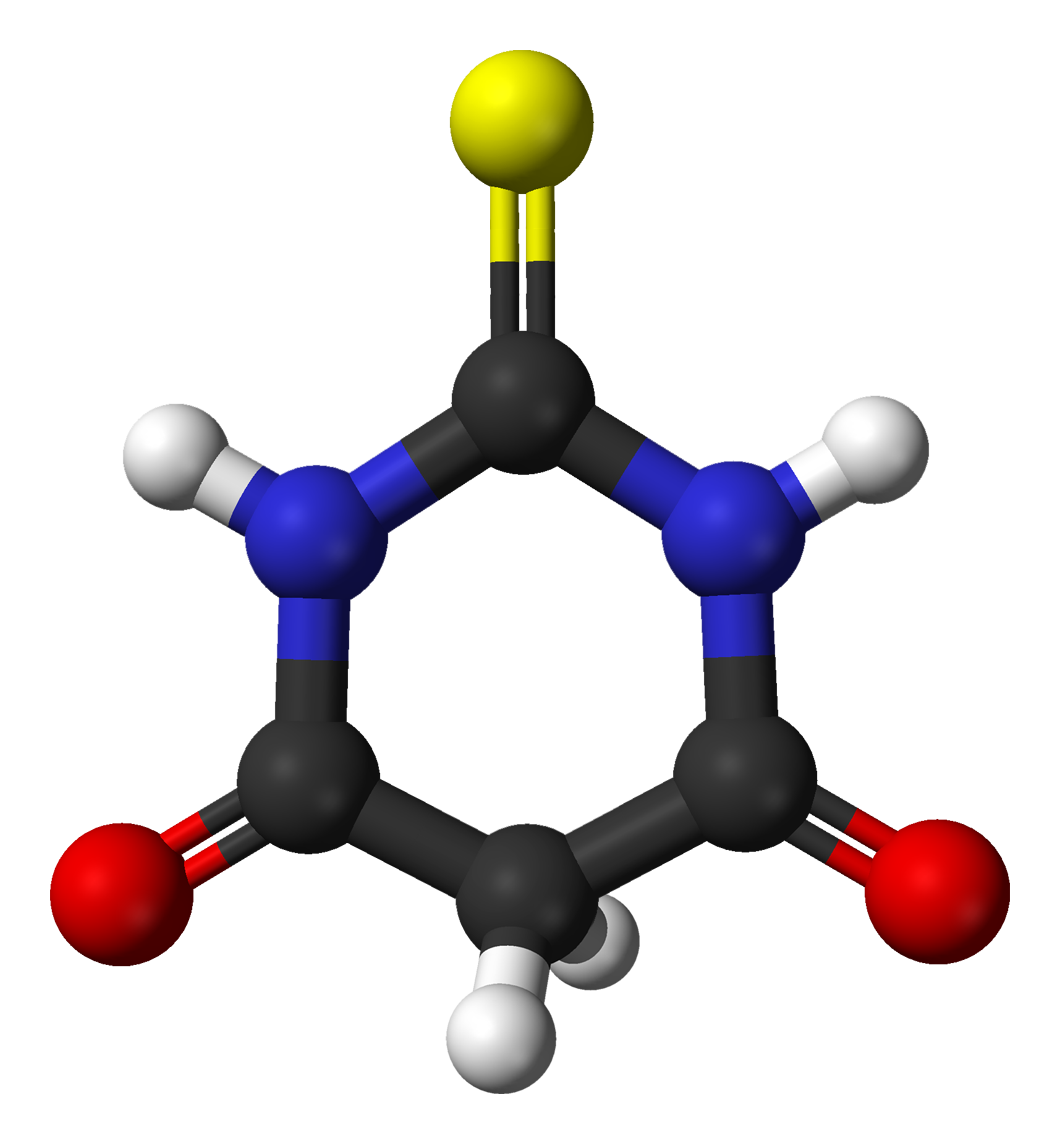
Ball-and-stick model of thiobarbituric acid

Names
- Preferred IUPAC name 2-Sulfanylidene-1,3-diazinane-4,6-dione
- Other names: 2-Thioxodihydropyrimidine-4,6(1H,5H)-dione; 2-Thiobarbituric acid

Identifiers
| CAS Number | 504-17-6 |
| 3D model (JSmol) | Interactive image |
| ChEMBL | ChEMBL584805 |
| ChemSpider | 2005830 |
| ECHA InfoCard | 100.007.260 |
| EC Number | 207-985-8 |
| PubChem CID | 2723628 |
| UNII | M1YZW5SS7C |
| CompTox Dashboard (EPA) | DTXSID7060124 |
- InChI: InChI=1S/C4H4N2O2S/c7-2-1-3(8)6-4(9)5-2/h1H2,(H2,5,6,7,8,9) Key: RVBUGGBMJDPOST-UHFFFAOYSA-N; InChI=1/C4H4N2O2S/c7-2-1-3(8)6-4(9)5-2/h1H2,(H2,5,6,7,8,9) Key: RVBUGGBMJDPOST-UHFFFAOYAX
- SMILES: O=C(NC(N1)=S)CC1=O

Properties
| Chemical formula | C_{4}H_{4}N_{2}O_{2}S |
| Molar mass | 144.15 g·mol^{−1} |
| Melting point | 245 °C (473 °F; 518 K) |
| Magnetic susceptibility (χ) | −72.9·10^{−6} cm^{3}/mol |
- Except where otherwise noted, data are given for materials in their standard state (at 25 °C [77 °F], 100 kPa). verify (what is ?) Infobox references

Thiobarbituric acid is an organic compound and a heterocycle. It is used as a reagent in assaying malondialdehyde (the TBARS assay of lipid peroxidation).

It is also used in Kodak Fogging Developer FD-70, part of the Kodak Direct Positive Film Developing Outfit for making black and white slides (positives).

The compound is a sulfur analog of barbituric acid. It can be synthesized by a condensation reaction between thiourea and diethyl malonate.
