= 1,1,3,3-Tetramethoxypropane =

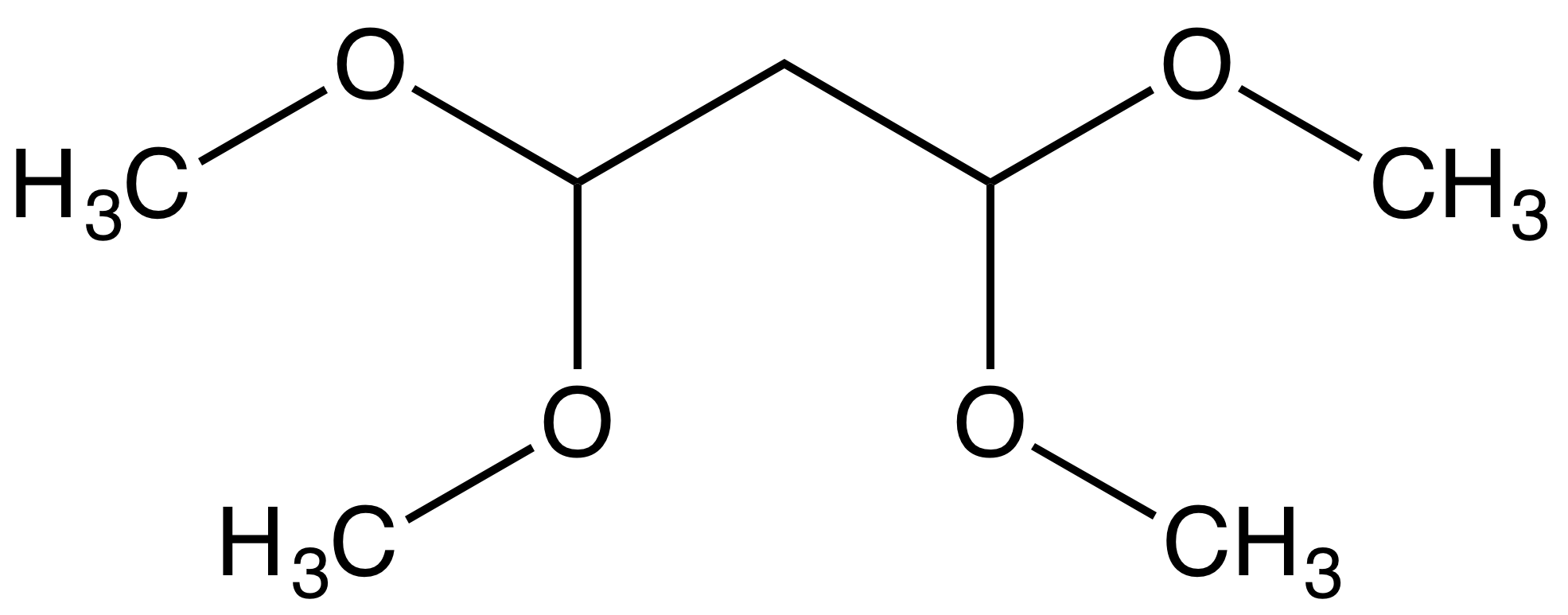

Names
- Preferred IUPAC name 1,1,3,3-Tetramethoxypropane
- Other names 1,1,3,3-Tetrakis(methyloxy)propane; Malonaldehyde, bis(dimethyl acetal)

Identifiers
CAS Number	102-52-3
3D model (JSmol)	Interactive image
ChEMBL	ChEMBL592723
ChemSpider	59410
ECHA InfoCard	100.002.762
EC Number	203-037-2
PubChem CID	66019
UNII	GUB3D2SV2S
CompTox Dashboard (EPA)	DTXSID4059255
- InChI: InChI=1S/C7H16O4/c1-8-6(9-2)5-7(10-3)11-4/h6-7H,5H2,1-4H3 Key: XHTYQFMRBQUCPX-UHFFFAOYSA-N
- SMILES: COC(CC(OC)OC)OC

Properties
Chemical formula	C_{7}H_{16}O_{4}
Molar mass	164.201 g·mol^{−1}
Appearance	Colorless liquid
Density	0.9895 g/cm^{3}
Boiling point	183 °C (361 °F; 456 K)

Hazards
- GHS labelling
Pictograms	(GHS02: Flammable)
Signal word	Warning
Hazard statements	H226
Precautionary statements	P210, P233, P240, P241, P242, P243, P280, P303+P361+P353, P370+P378, P403+P235, P501
- Except where otherwise noted, data are given for materials in their standard state (at 25 °C [77 °F], 100 kPa). Infobox references

1,1,3,3-Tetramethoxypropane is an organic compound with the formula CH_{2}(CH(OCH_{3})_{2})_{2}. A colorless liquid, it is a protected form of malondialdehyde, a usefully reactive reagent that has poor storage properties.
