= ALDH16A1 =

Protein-coding gene in the species Homo sapiens

Identifiers
- Aliases: ALDH16A1, aldehyde dehydrogenase 16 family member A1
- External IDs: OMIM: 613358; MGI: 1916998; GeneCards: ALDH16A1

Gene location (Human)
Chr.	Chromosome 19 (human)
Band	19q13.33	Start	49,453,225 bp
Band	19q13.33	End	49,471,050 bp

Gene location (Mouse)
Chr.	Chromosome 7 (mouse)
Band	7|7 B3	Start	44,790,108 bp
Band	7|7 B3	End	44,804,008 bp
RNA expression pattern
Bgee	Human / Mouse (ortholog); Top expressed in: granulocyte; spleen; mucosa of transverse colon; canal of the cervix; ectocervix; apex of heart; right lobe of liver; body of pancreas; right adrenal gland; skin of leg / Top expressed in: duodenum; right kidney; proximal tubule; jejunum; granulocyte; epithelium of small intestine; crypt of lieberkuhn of small intestine; interventricular septum; internal carotid artery; ileum; More reference expression data
BioGPS	n/a
Gene ontology
Molecular function	oxidoreductase activity; aldehyde dehydrogenase (NAD+) activity; oxidoreductase activity, acting on the aldehyde or oxo group of donors, NAD or NADP as acceptor
Cellular component	extracellular exosome; membrane
Biological process	metabolism
Sources:Amigo / QuickGO
Orthologs
Databases	NCBI: entry; OMA: entry
Species	Human	Mouse
Entrez	126133	69748
Ensembl	ENSG00000161618	ENSMUSG00000007833
UniProt	Q8IZ83	Q571I9
RefSeq (mRNA)	NM_001145396; NM_153329	NM_145954
RefSeq (protein)	NP_001138868; NP_699160	NP_666066
Location (UCSC)	Chr 19: 49.45 – 49.47 Mb	Chr 7: 44.79 – 44.8 Mb
PubMed search
- Wikidata
View/Edit Human	View/Edit Mouse

Aldehyde dehydrogenase 16 family, member A1 also known as ALDH16A1 is an aldehyde dehydrogenase gene.

== Clinical significance ==
Mutations in the SPG21 (ACP33/maspardin) gene are associated with the mast syndrome, a type of spastic paraplegia. The protein encoded by the SPG21 gene has been shown to interact with the ALDH16A1 enzyme.
