= DNA adduct =

Segment of DNA bound to a cancer-causing chemical

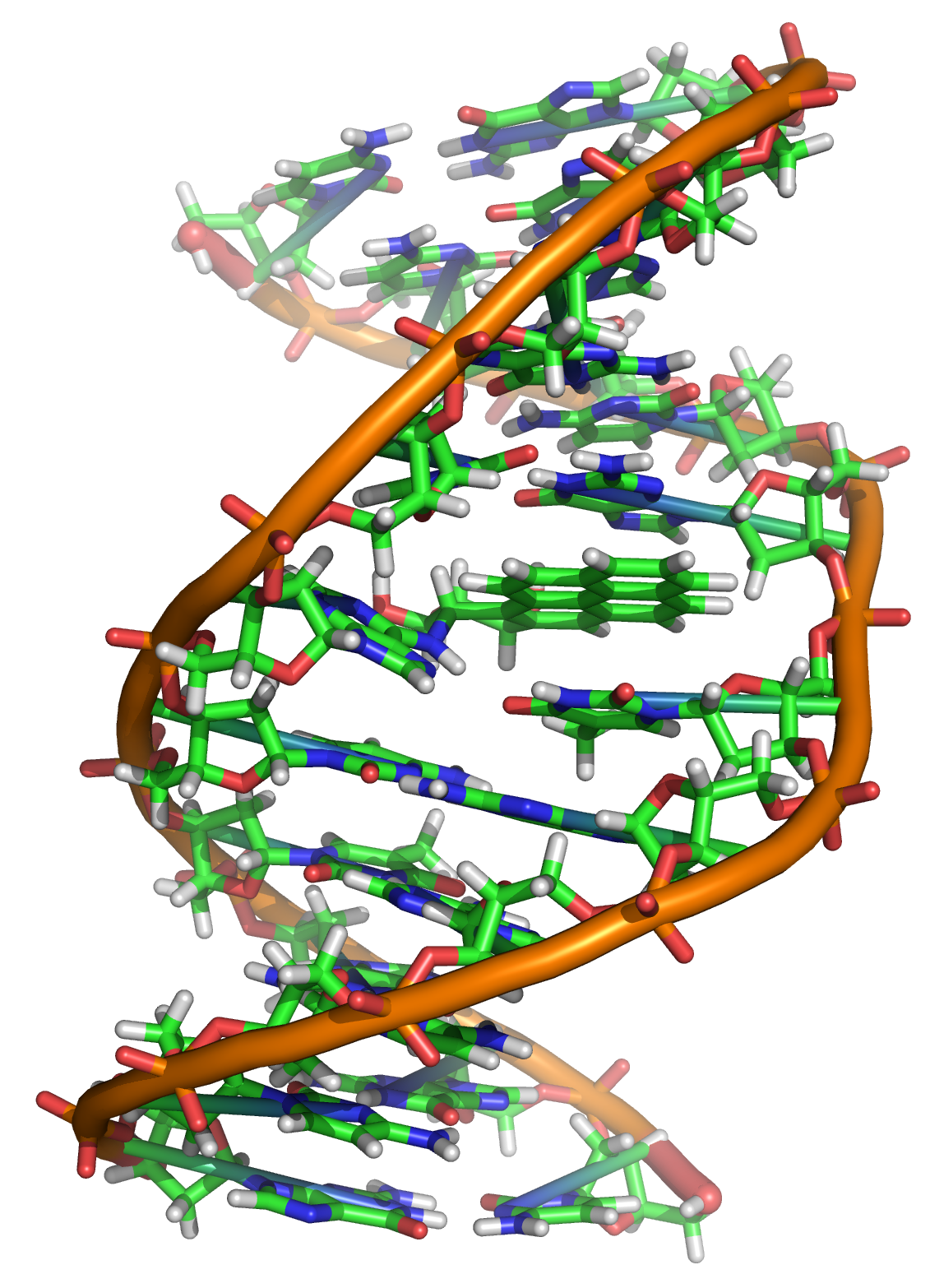
A metabolite of benzo[a]pyrene forms an intercalated DNA adduct, at center

In molecular genetics, a DNA adduct is a segment of DNA bound to a cancer-causing chemical. This process could lead to the development of cancerous cells, or carcinogenesis. DNA adducts in scientific experiments are used as biomarkers of exposure. They are especially useful in quantifying an organism's exposure to a carcinogen. The presence of such an adduct indicates prior exposure to a potential carcinogen, but it does not necessarily indicate the presence of cancer in the subject animal.

DNA adducts are researched in laboratory settings. A typical experimental design for studying DNA adducts is to induce them with known carcinogens. A scientific journal will often incorporate the name of the carcinogen with their experimental design. For example, the term "DMBA-DNA adduct" in a scientific journal refers to a piece of DNA that has DMBA (7,12-dimethylbenz(a)anthracene) attached to it.

== Carcinogens' impact ==
Several diseases, including cancer, develop from mutated DNA. These mutations are caused by carcinogens through external and internal factors. Carcinogens are chemical or physical agents that cause DNA damage, which may later develop into cancer. They can initiate mutagenesis in DNA by interfering with the replication process. These interactions typically cause chemical adducts to form in the cell. This allows for DNA adducts to serve as biomarkers of exposure to carcinogens from the environment. They are attractive biomarkers because they are stable, abundant, and easily characterizable. Exposure to them can directly or indirectly cause DNA damage. In the direct case, a carcinogen can bind to DNA and cause it to distort or become cross-linked. Although DNA repair happens under normal circumstances, sometimes the DNA will not repair itself. This could be the start of a mutation, or mutagenesis. Repeated mutations can lead to carcinogenesis – the beginnings of cancer.

The presence of endogenous carcinogens contributes to levels of DNA adducts in a patient. This can bias the quantification of carcinogens that are from environmental exposure. Ongoing research on DNA adducts seeks to overcome these complications. It is the hope that in future medical practices DNA adducts may serve to guide therapeutic treatments that are more targeted and effective.

=== Mechanism of DNA damage ===
Adduct formation is determined by the structures of reactive chemicals, the movement(s) of electrophiles, and the capacity of the compounds to bind with DNA, potentially driving adduct formation to specific nucleophilic sites. The N3 and N7 locations (nucleotide positioning) of guanine and adenine are believed to be the most nucleophilic, and hence, they form adducts selectively over exocyclic oxygen atoms. The generation of DNA adducts is also influenced by certain steric factors. Guanine's N7 position is exposed in the major groove of double-helical DNA, making it more suitable for adduction than when compared to adenine's N3 position, which is orientated in the minor groove.

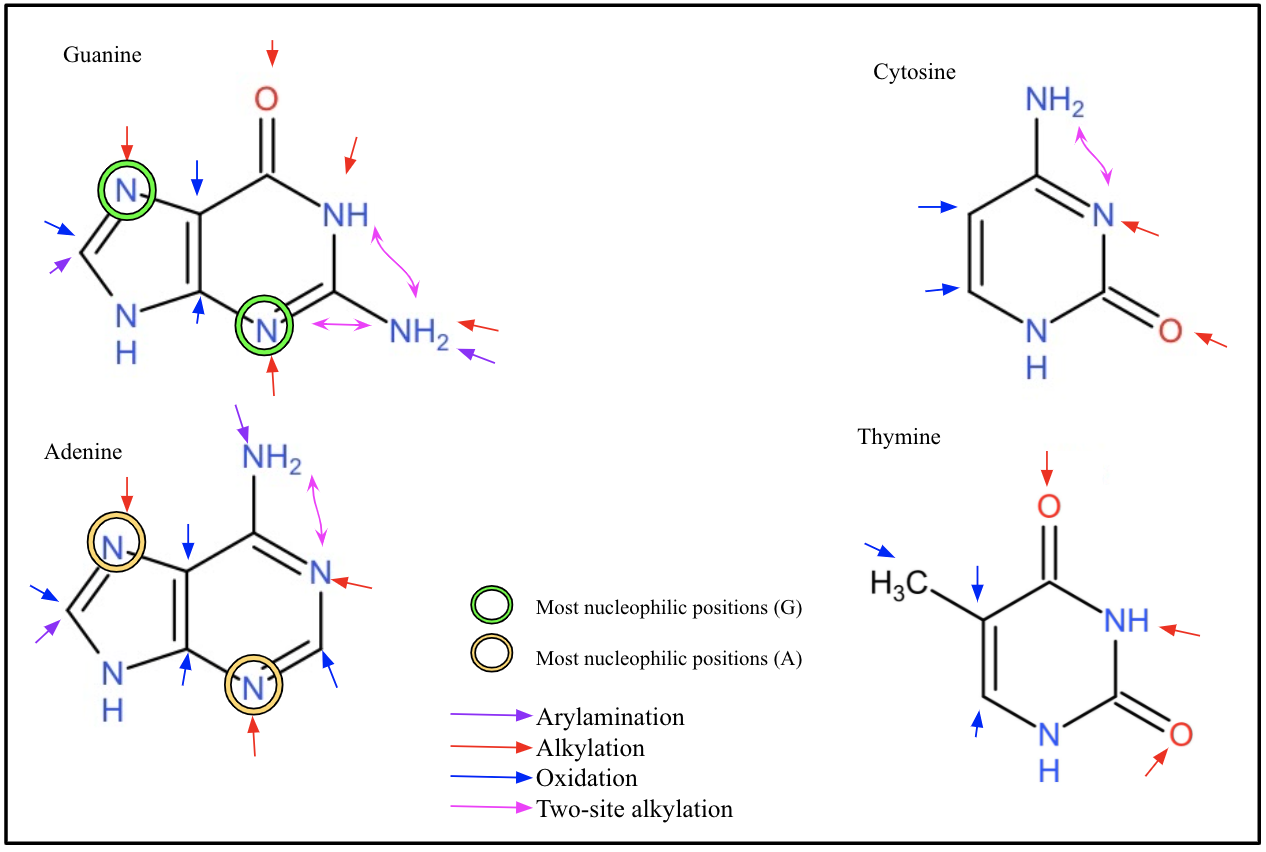
Figure 2: Reactive Sites of Interest for Nucleic Acids in DNA Adduct Formation

Many compounds require enzyme metabolic activation to become mutagenic and cause DNA damage. Furthermore, reactive intermediates can be produced in the body as a result of oxidative stress, thus harming the DNA. Some chemical carcinogens, metabolites, as well as endogenous compounds generated by inflammatory processes cause oxidative stress. This can result in the formation of a reactive oxygen species (ROS) or reactive nitrogen species (RNS). ROS and RNS are known to cause DNA damage via oxidative processes. Figure 2 shows each of the reactive sites for the nucleic acids involved in adduction and damage, with each form of transfer distinguished by arrow color. These positions are of interest to researchers studying DNA adduct formation. Research has indicated that many different chemicals may change human DNA and that lifestyle and host characteristics can impact the extent of DNA damage. Humans are constantly exposed to a diverse combination of potentially dangerous substances that might cause DNA damage.

== Chemicals that form DNA adducts ==
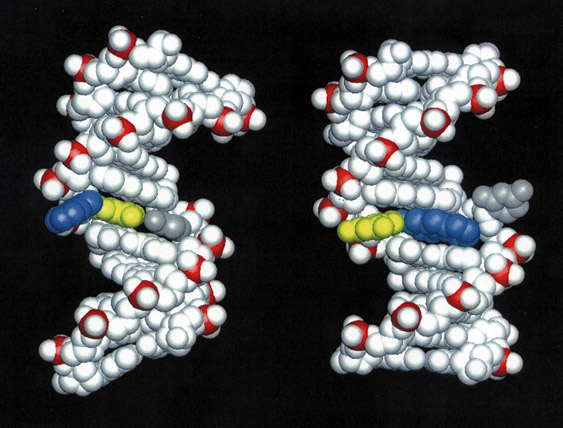
Figure 3: DNA damaged by carcinogenic 2-aminofluorene

- acetaldehyde, a significant constituent of tobacco smoke
- cisplatin, which binds to DNA and causes crosslinking (leading to cell death)
- DMBA (7,12-dimethylbenz(a)anthracene)
- malondialdehyde, a naturally occurring product of lipid peroxidation
- polycyclic aromatic hydrocarbons (PAHs)
- nitro-PAHs
- Nitrosamines
- Aflatoxins
- Mustards
- aromatic amines
- heterocyclic aromatic amines (HAAs)
- methylating agents
- other alkylating agents
- Haloalkanes

== Detection methods ==
32P-postlabeling assay:

- 32P-postlabeling assays screen for DNA adducts by transferring 32P-ATP into a carcinogenic labeled nucleotide sequence, with selectivity favoring modified nucleotides.

Liquid chromatography–mass spectrometry (LC–MS):

- Liquid chromatography–mass spectrometry to a greater extent has replaced the 32P-postlabeling assay as the method of choice for the detection of structurally characterized DNA adducts.

Fluorescence labeling:

- Certain DNA adducts can also be detected by the means of fluorescence because they contain fluorescent chromophores.

Enzyme linked immunosorbent assay (ELISA):

- ELISA contains an antigen in solution that can bind with DNA adducts. Any remaining free antigen will fluoresce. This allows ELISA to quantify DNA adducts as well as map an inverse relationship between DNA damage and the intensity of the samples fluorescence.

== DNA adduct as biomarkers of exposure ==
=== Beef diet ===
Human consumption of more than 2.5–3.5 oz (70–100 g) of red meat (beef, lamb or pork) a day increases the risk of colon cancer, but eating chicken does not have this risk. The increased risk of colon cancer from red meat may be due to higher increases in DNA adducts from digestion of red meat. When rats were fed either beef or chicken, three types of DNA adducts in colon tissue were significantly higher after consumption of beef than after consumption of chicken. These adducts were a type of methyl-cytosine (possibly N3-methyl-cytosine), an adduct of two malondialdehyde molecules with guanine, and carboxyl-adenine.

=== Tobacco use ===
Human exposure to tobacco smoke has been associated with an increased risk of lung cancer. Tobacco smoke can impose great risk to DNA, with chemicals such as formaldehyde and acetaldehyde reacting directly with DNA to form adducts. In addition, there are other tobacco-specific carcinogens to consider in humans that are activated metabolically, such as nicotine-derived nitrosamine ketone (NNK) and N'-nitrosonornicotine (NNN). These carcinogens end up forming adducts when reacted with DNA, with those being called pyridyl oxobutyl (POB) adducts.

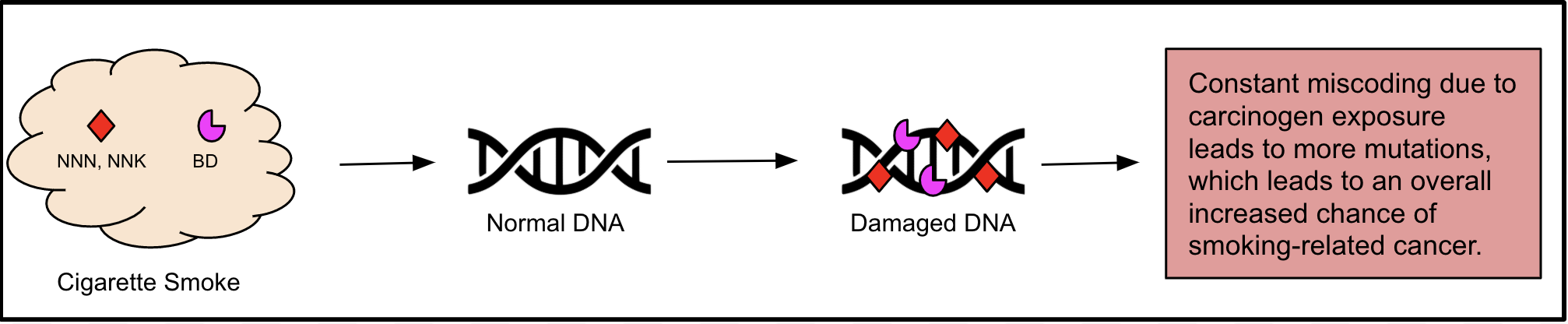
Figure 4: Effects of Tobacco on Healthy Human DNA

Further analysis has been conducted on the topic, determining that 1,3-Butadiene (BD) is a human carcinogen that is found in cigarette smoke among other synthetic polymer industries. Tests were conducted to understand the differences in the level of urinary BD-DNA adducts among various ethnic groups – white, Japanese American, and Native Hawaiian. It was determined that Japanese American smokers exhibited heightened levels of urinary BD-induced guanine adducts than white and Native Hawaiian individuals, while there were no differences in outcome by ethnicity among non-smokers. Understanding the epigenetic and genetic factors driving these differences in urinary BD-DNA adduct presence is the next step for this research, serving as a link between sociology and the life sciences.

=== Airborne particulate matter ===
Particulate matter (PM), broadly known as air pollution, is considered a group 1 carcinogen by the International Agency for Research on Cancer; while it is unclear if a direct link between cancer and PM exposure exists, it is likely that PM exposure leads to some degree of cell damage. Upon further investigation, it was determined that PM exposure causes oxidative stress – creating reactive oxygen species, forming DNA adducts, and inducing double-strand breaks (DSBs). In regards to DNA adduct formation, this analysis was conducted after looking at leukocytes from residents of heavily populated cities (e.g. pollution, long-term traffic); a common component of PMs, polycyclic aromatic hydrocarbon (PAH), was one of the many molecules considered to be highly correlated with the presence of DNA bulky lesions in these individuals. These findings support the theory that DNA adduct presence indicates a level of carcinogenic activity.

== See also ==
- Adduct
- Adductomics
