= Glucic acid =

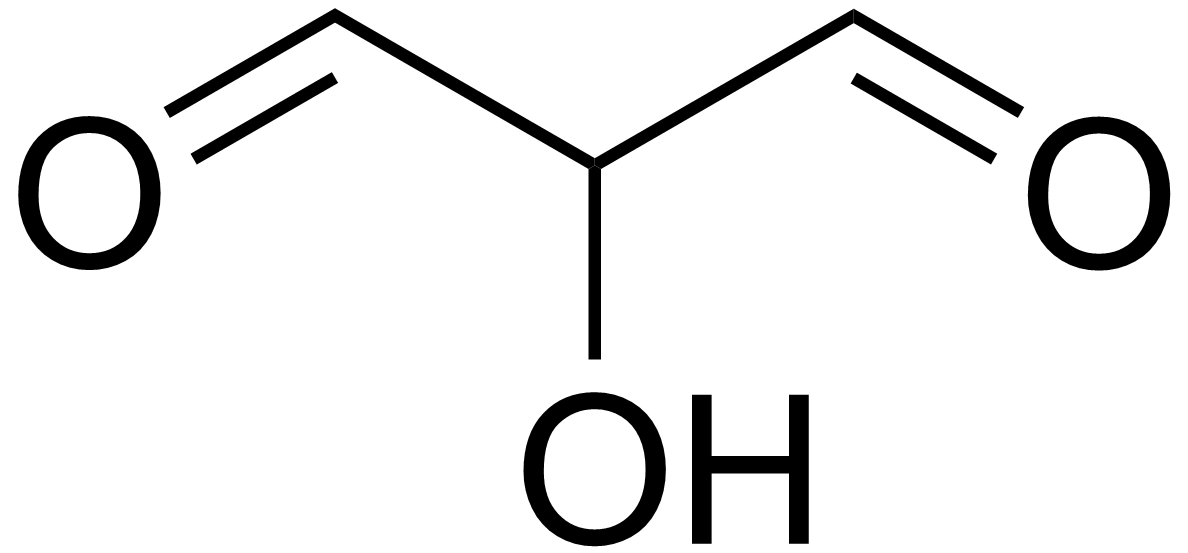

Names
- Preferred IUPAC name Hydroxypropanedial
- Other names: Hydroxymalonaldehyde; 2-Hydroxypropanedial; Reductone; Tartronaldehyde; 2-Hydroxymalonaldehyde; 2-Hydroxymalondialdehyde; Glucose-reductone; Tartronal; Tartronic aldehyde; Triose reductone

Identifiers
CAS Number	497-15-4
3D model (JSmol)	Interactive image
ChemSpider	3650542
PubChem CID	4451502
UNII	5R0YG3SBR7
- InChI: InChI=1S/C3H4O3/c4-1-3(6)2-5/h1-3,6H Key: NVXLIZQNSVLKPO-UHFFFAOYSA-N; InChI=1/C3H4O3/c4-1-3(6)2-5/h1-3,6H Key: NVXLIZQNSVLKPO-UHFFFAOYAQ
- SMILES: O=CC(O)C=O

Properties
Chemical formula	C_{3}H_{4}O_{3}
Molar mass	88.062 g·mol^{−1}
Density	1.38 g/mL
Melting point	149 °C (300 °F; 422 K) (decomposes)
Boiling point	274 °C (525 °F; 547 K)

Related compounds
Related alkenals	4-Hydroxynonenal; Malondialdehyde
- Except where otherwise noted, data are given for materials in their standard state (at 25 °C [77 °F], 100 kPa). verify (what is ?) Infobox references

Glucic acid is an organic compound with the chemical formula C_{3}H_{4}O_{3}. It is classified as a reductone.

Tautomeric forms of glucic acid

== Production ==
Glucic acid is produced by heating fructose under alkaline conditions. Under acidic conditions, levulinic acid is produced instead.

It also occurs in the hydrolysis of sucrose under alkaline conditions as prolonged heating causes the resulting hexoses to further decompose into several compounds, including glucic acid.
