= Adductome =

Study of DNA adducts

At its simplest, the adductome is the totality of chemical adducts that are present in particular cellular macromolecules such as DNA, RNA, or proteins found within the organism. These adducts can detrimentally alter the chemical properties of these macromolecules and are therefore also referred to as damage. Adducts may arise as a consequence of the chemical reaction between a given "physicochemical agent to which an organism is exposed across the lifespan" (sometimes referred to as the exposome). These physicochemical agents can be exogenous in origin and include ionizing and non-ionizing radiation, the diet, lifestyle factors, pollution, and xenobiotics. They may damage the macromolecules directly or indirectly, e.g., some xenobiotic substances require metabolism of the xenobiotic to produce a chemically reactive metabolite, which can then form a covalent bond with the endogenous macromolecule. Agents that damage macromolecules can also arise from endogenous sources, such as reactive oxygen species that are a side product of normal respiration, leading to the formation of oxidatively damaged DNA etc., or other reactive species, e.g., reactive nitrogen, sulphur, carbon, selenium, and halogen species.

The term "adductome" first appeared in a journal article in 2005. Although originally the term related to adducts of DNA, the adductomic approach has now been adopted by protein chemists in their attempts to identify protein adducts. More recently, this has been extended by Kanaly's group to include RNA adducts. Most recently, nucleic acid adductomics has been reported, which has the potential to study a range of DNA and RNA adducts.

== DNA and RNA ==
DNA adducts arise from compounds that bind to DNA and covalently modify the DNA, resulting in damage. This damage can result in mutations. These mutations can result in a variety of adverse health effects, including cancer and birth defects in multicellular organisms. The science of adductomics seeks to identify and measure all DNA, RNA, or protein adducts, identify their origins, and determine their role in health and disease.

Cellular DNA and/or RNA adductomics is performed after the target nucleic acid has been extracted from the cells (e.g., from cultured cells or tissues). Urinary DNA adductomics non-invasively evaluates DNA adducts that are present in urine, following their DNA repair.

== Nucleic acid ==
Nucleic acid (NA) adductomics brings together DNA, RNA, and, to some extent, protein adductomics to provide a more comprehensive view of the adduct burden to these molecules. NA adductomics builds upon previous DNA adductomics and DNA crosslinkomics (which aims to analyze the totality of DNA-DNA crosslinks) assays and encompasses the analysis of modified (2′-deoxy)ribonucleosides (2′-dN/rN), modified nucleobases (nB), plus DNA-DNA, RNA-RNA, DNA-RNA, DNA-protein, and RNA-protein crosslinks. Interestingly, many of these types of adducts are seen in urine from healthy humans, using urinary NA adductomics. Confirmation of the presence of DNA-RNA crosslinks in urine came from a recent study that demonstrated the presence of cellular DNA-RNA crosslinks arising from formaldehyde exposure.
