= ALDH3B2 =

Protein-coding gene in the species Homo sapiens

Identifiers
- Aliases: ALDH3B2, ALDH8, aldehyde dehydrogenase 3 family member B2
- External IDs: OMIM: 601917; MGI: 1920708; GeneCards: ALDH3B2
Enzyme activity
EC #	BRENDA	ExPASy	KEGG	MetaCyc
1.2.1.3	↗	↗	↗	↗
1.2.1.48	↗	↗	↗	↗

Gene location (Human)
Chr.	Chromosome 11 (human)
Band	11q13.2	Start	67,662,155 bp
Band	11q13.2	End	67,681,224 bp

Gene location (Mouse)
Chr.	Chromosome 19 (mouse)
Band	19|19 A	Start	4,008,645 bp
Band	19|19 A	End	4,022,103 bp
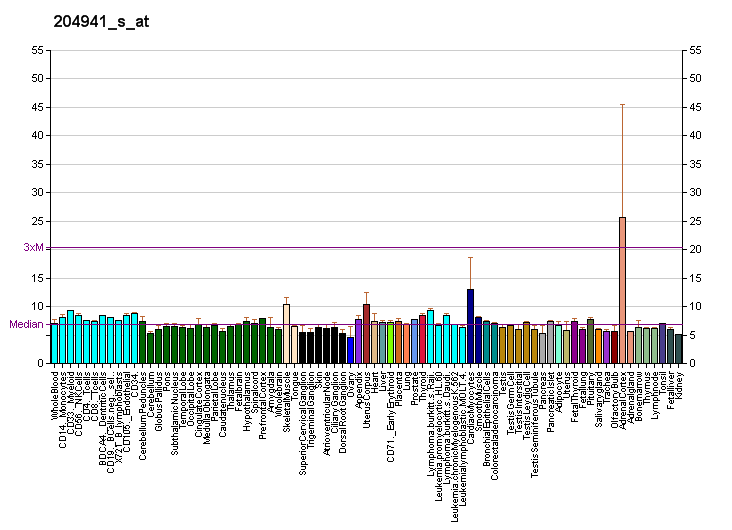

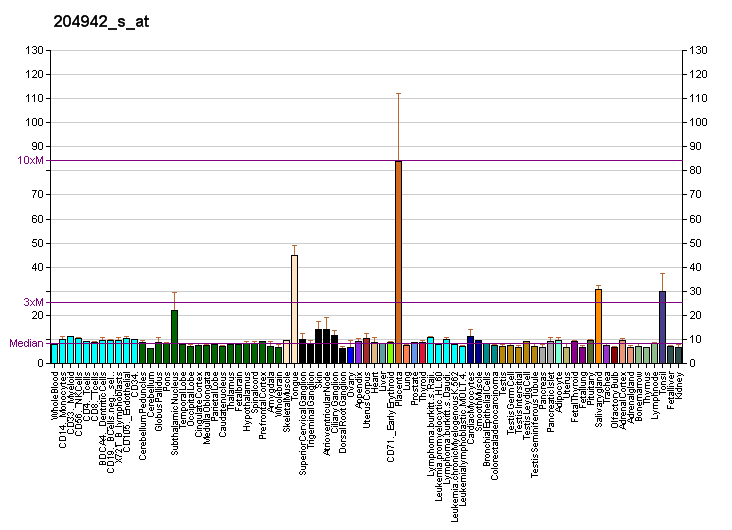
RNA expression pattern
Bgee	Human / Mouse (ortholog); Top expressed in: skin of thigh; skin of arm; vulva; skin of abdomen; gingival epithelium; oral cavity; parotid gland; human penis; nipple; skin of hip / Top expressed in: granulocyte; lumbar subsegment of spinal cord; proximal tubule; right kidney; outer nuclear layer; skin of back; skin of external ear; lip; morula; blastocyst; More reference expression data
BioGPS	More reference expression data
Gene ontology
Molecular function	3-chloroallyl aldehyde dehydrogenase activity; oxidoreductase activity; aldehyde dehydrogenase [NAD(P)+ activity]; oxidoreductase activity, acting on the aldehyde or oxo group of donors, NAD or NADP as acceptor
Cellular component	lipid droplet
Biological process	ethanol catabolic process; metabolism; alcohol metabolic process; lipid metabolism; sphingolipid biosynthetic process
Sources:Amigo / QuickGO
Orthologs
Databases	NCBI: entry; OMA: entry
Species	Human	Mouse
Entrez	222	73458
Ensembl	ENSG00000132746	ENSMUSG00000037263
UniProt	P48448	J3QMK6
RefSeq (mRNA)	NM_000695; NM_001031615; NM_001354345; NM_001393400; NM_001393401 NM_001393402	NM_028545
RefSeq (protein)	NP_000686; NP_001026786; NP_001341274	NP_082821
Location (UCSC)	Chr 11: 67.66 – 67.68 Mb	Chr 19: 4.01 – 4.02 Mb
PubMed search
- Wikidata
View/Edit Human	View/Edit Mouse

Aldehyde dehydrogenase family 3 member B2 is an enzyme that, in humans, is encoded by the ALDH3B2 gene.

This gene encodes a member of the aldehyde dehydrogenase family, a group of isozymes that may play a major role in the detoxification of aldehydes generated by alcohol metabolism and lipid peroxidation. The gene for this particular family member is over 10 kb in length. The expression of these transcripts is restricted to the salivary gland among the human tissues examined. Alternate transcriptional splice variants have been characterized.
