= ALDH8A1 =

Protein-coding gene in the species Homo sapiens

Identifiers
- Aliases: ALDH8A1, aldehyde dehydrogenase 8 family, member A1, ALDH12, DJ352A20.2, aldehyde dehydrogenase 8 family member A1
- External IDs: OMIM: 606467; MGI: 2653900; GeneCards: ALDH8A1
Enzyme activity
| EC # | BRENDA | ExPASy | KEGG | MetaCyc |
|---|---|---|---|---|
| 1.2.1.32 | ↗ | ↗ | ↗ | ↗ |

Gene location (Human)
| Chr. | Chromosome 6 (human) |
| Band | 6q23.3 | Start | 134,917,393 bp |
| Band | 6q23.3 | End | 134,950,115 bp |

Gene location (Mouse)
| Chr. | Chromosome 10 (mouse) |
| Band | 10|10 A3 | Start | 21,253,190 bp |
| Band | 10|10 A3 | End | 21,272,484 bp |
RNA expression pattern
| Bgee | Human / Mouse (ortholog); Top expressed in: kidney tubule; liver; glomerulus; right lobe of liver; metanephric glomerulus; renal medulla; human kidney; testicle; inferior olivary nucleus; gonad / Top expressed in: right kidney; human kidney; left lobe of liver; proximal tubule; sexually immature organism; embryo; ureter; human fetus; muscle of thigh; seminiferous tubule; More reference expression data |
| BioGPS | n/a |
Gene ontology
| Molecular function | oxidoreductase activity; retinal dehydrogenase activity; oxidoreductase activity, acting on the aldehyde or oxo group of donors, NAD or NADP as acceptor; aminomuconate-semialdehyde dehydrogenase activity |
| Cellular component | cytoplasm; cytosol; extracellular exosome; intracellular anatomical structure |
| Biological process | metabolism; 9-cis-retinoic acid biosynthetic process; retinoic acid metabolic process; retinal metabolic process; L-kynurenine catabolic process |
Sources:Amigo / QuickGO
Orthologs
| Databases | NCBI: entry; OMA: entry |
| Species | Human | Mouse |
| Entrez | 64577 | 237320 |
| Ensembl | ENSG00000118514 | ENSMUSG00000037542 |
| UniProt | Q9H2A2 | Q8BH00 |
| RefSeq (mRNA) | NM_001193480; NM_022568; NM_170771 | NM_178713 |
| RefSeq (protein) | NP_001180409; NP_072090; NP_739577 | NP_848828 |
| Location (UCSC) | Chr 6: 134.92 – 134.95 Mb | Chr 10: 21.25 – 21.27 Mb |
| PubMed search |
- Wikidata
| View/Edit Human | View/Edit Mouse |

Aldehyde dehydrogenase 8 family, member A1 also known as ALDH8A1 is an enzyme that in humans is encoded by the ALDH8A1 gene.

== Function ==
This protein belongs to the aldehyde dehydrogenase family of enzymes. It was originally thought to play a role in a pathway of 9-cis-retinoic acid biosynthesis in vivo. However, bioinformatics and experimental work has shown that it is more likely the aldehyde dehydrogenase of the kynurenine pathway, oxidizing 2-aminomuconate semialdehyde to 2-aminomuconic acid. Two transcript variants encoding distinct isoforms have been identified for this gene.
