= Reductone =

A reductone is a special class of organic compounds. They are enediols with a carbonyl group adjacent to the enediol group, i.e. RC(OH)=C(OH)-C(O)R. The enediol structure is stabilized by the resonance resulting from the tautomerism with the adjacent carbonyl. Therefore, the chemical equilibrium produces mainly the enediol form rather than the keto form.

Reductones are reducing agents, thus efficacious antioxidants. Some are fairly strong acids. Examples of reductones are tartronaldehyde, reductic acid and ascorbic acid.

Examples of reductones
Tartronaldehyde	Reductic acid	Ascorbic acid (Vitamin C)
