= ALDH3B1 =

Protein-coding gene in the species Homo sapiens

Identifiers
- Aliases: ALDH3B1, ALDH4, ALDH7, aldehyde dehydrogenase 3 family member B1
- External IDs: OMIM: 600466; MGI: 1914939; GeneCards: ALDH3B1
Enzyme activity
EC #	BRENDA	ExPASy	KEGG	MetaCyc
1.2.1.5	↗	↗	↗	↗
1.2.1.7	↗	↗	↗	↗
1.2.1.28	↗	↗	↗	↗
1.2.1.48	↗	↗	↗	↗

Gene location (Human)
Chr.	Chromosome 11 (human)
Band	11q13.2	Start	68,008,578 bp
Band	11q13.2	End	68,029,282 bp

Gene location (Mouse)
Chr.	Chromosome 19 (mouse)
Band	19|19 A	Start	3,963,491 bp
Band	19|19 A	End	3,979,808 bp
RNA expression pattern
Bgee	Human / Mouse (ortholog); Top expressed in: bronchial epithelial cell; right uterine tube; olfactory zone of nasal mucosa; nasal epithelium; monocyte; right lung; mucosa of paranasal sinus; granulocyte; thoracic diaphragm; beta cell / Top expressed in: granulocyte; spermatid; Epithelium of choroid plexus; right kidney; right lung lobe; stroma of bone marrow; duodenum; tibiofemoral joint; seminiferous tubule; jejunum; More reference expression data
BioGPS	n/a
Gene ontology
Molecular function	3-chloroallyl aldehyde dehydrogenase activity; protein binding; oxidoreductase activity; aldehyde dehydrogenase [NAD(P)+ activity]; aldehyde dehydrogenase (NAD+) activity; oxidoreductase activity, acting on the aldehyde or oxo group of donors, NAD or NADP as acceptor
Cellular component	vesicle; membrane; plasma membrane; extracellular exosome; secretory granule membrane; specific granule membrane; cytoplasm; cytosol
Biological process	ethanol catabolic process; lipid metabolism; aldehyde catabolic process; sphingolipid biosynthetic process; cellular aldehyde metabolic process; cellular response to oxidative stress; metabolism; alcohol metabolic process; neutrophil degranulation
Sources:Amigo / QuickGO
Orthologs
Databases	NCBI: entry; OMA: entry
Species	Human	Mouse
Entrez	221	67689
Ensembl	ENSG00000006534	ENSMUSG00000024885
UniProt	P43353; Q9BUJ8	Q80VQ0
RefSeq (mRNA)	NM_001290059; NM_000694; NM_001030010; NM_001161473; NM_001290058	NM_026316
RefSeq (protein)	NP_000685; NP_001025181; NP_001154945; NP_001276987; NP_001276988	NP_080592
Location (UCSC)	Chr 11: 68.01 – 68.03 Mb	Chr 19: 3.96 – 3.98 Mb
PubMed search
- Wikidata
View/Edit Human	View/Edit Mouse

Aldehyde dehydrogenase 3 family, member B1 also known as ALDH3B1 is an enzyme that in humans is encoded by the ALDH3B1 gene.

== Function ==
The aldehyde dehydrogenases are a family of isozymes that may play a major role in the detoxification of aldehydes generated by alcohol metabolism and lipid peroxidation. This particular gene spans about 20 kb of genomic DNA and is composed of 9 coding exons. The gene encodes a single transcript of 2.8 kb that is highly expressed in kidney and lung. The functional significance of this gene and the cellular localization of its product are presently unknown. Two transcript variants encoding different isoforms have been found for this gene.
