= Malondialdehyde =

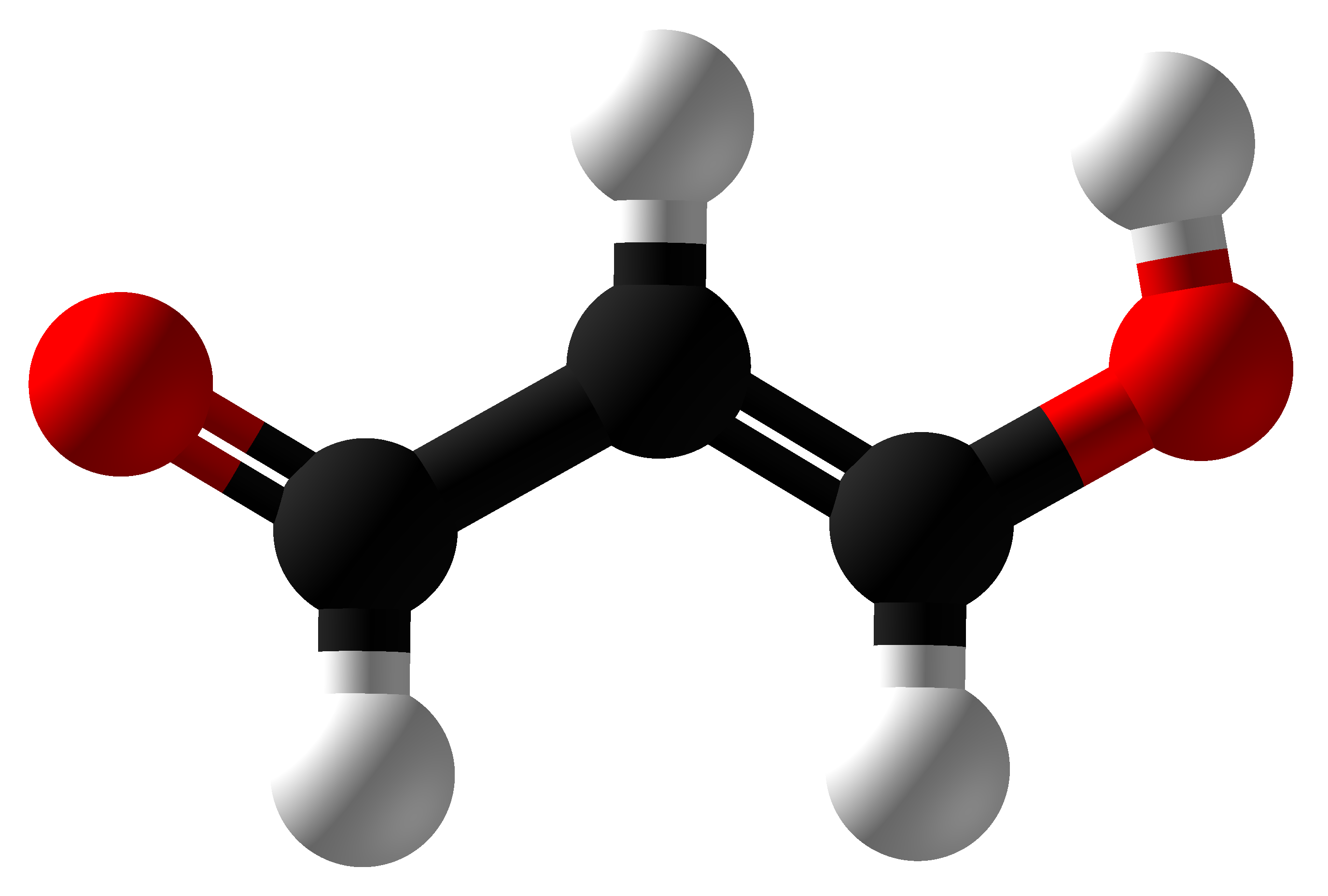

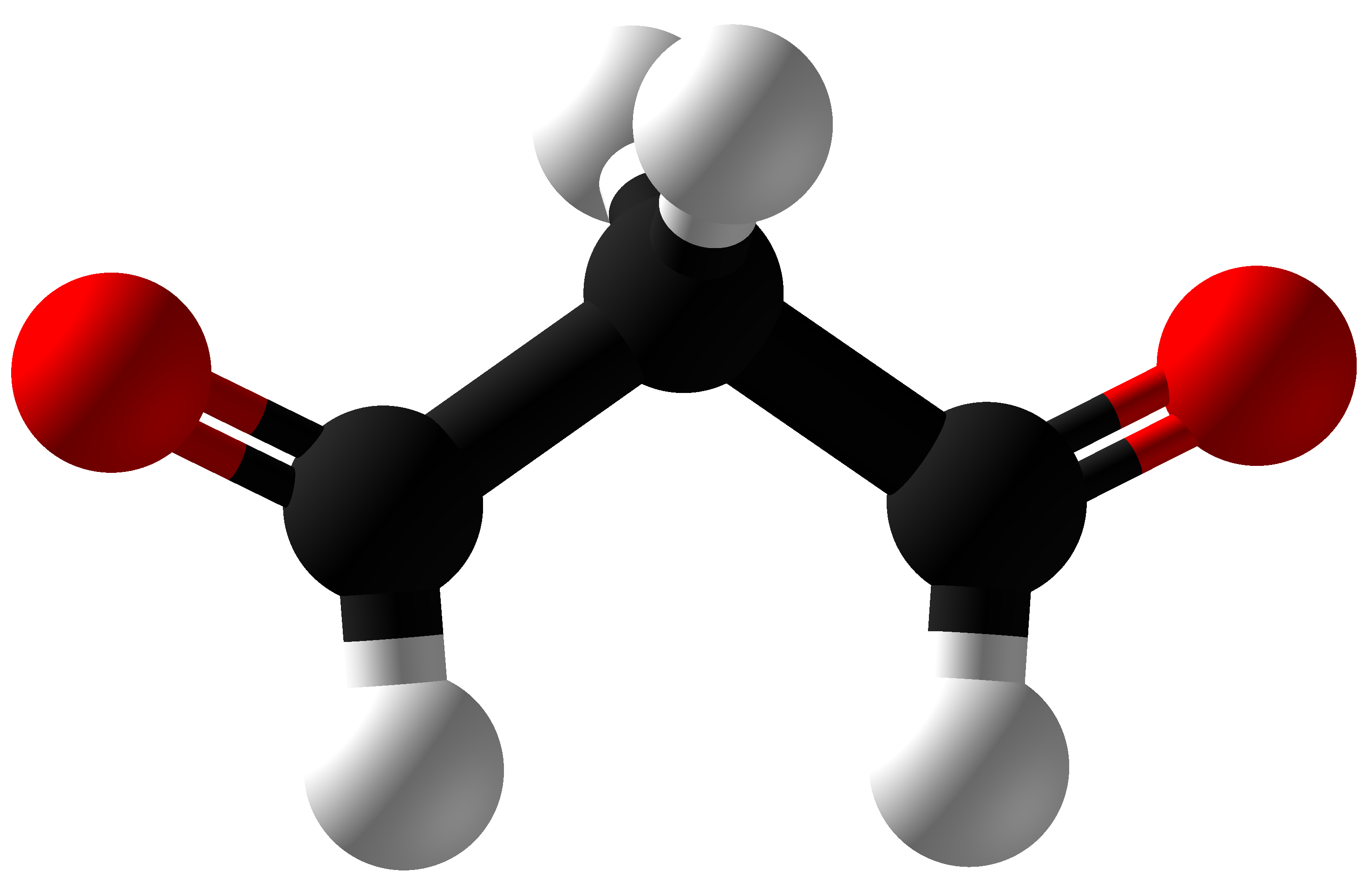

Names
- IUPAC name propanedial
- Other names Malonic aldehyde; Malonodialdehyde; Propanedial; 1,3-Propanedial; Malonaldehyde; Malonyldialdehyde

Identifiers
CAS Number	542-78-9
3D model (JSmol)	dialdehyde: Interactive image; enol: Interactive image
Abbreviations	MDA
ChemSpider	10499
KEGG	C19440
PubChem CID	10964
UNII	4Y8F71G49Q
CompTox Dashboard (EPA)	DTXSID90202556
- InChI: InChI=1S/C3H4O2/c4-2-1-3-5/h2-3H,1H2 Key: WSMYVTOQOOLQHP-UHFFFAOYSA-N; InChI=1/C3H4O2/c4-2-1-3-5/h2-3H,1H2 Key: WSMYVTOQOOLQHP-UHFFFAOYAU
- SMILES: dialdehyde: O=CCC=O; enol: OC=CC=O

Properties
Chemical formula	C_{3}H_{4}O_{2}
Molar mass	72.063 g·mol^{−1}
Appearance	Needle-like solid
Density	0.991 g/mL
Melting point	72 °C (162 °F; 345 K)
Boiling point	108 °C (226 °F; 381 K)

Hazards
- NIOSH (US health exposure limits)
PEL (Permissible)	none
REL (Recommended)	Ca
IDLH (Immediate danger)	Ca [N.D.]

Related compounds
Related alkenals	Glucic acid 4-Hydroxynonenal
- Except where otherwise noted, data are given for materials in their standard state (at 25 °C [77 °F], 100 kPa). verify (what is ?) Infobox references

Malondialdehyde belongs to the class of β-dicarbonyls. A colorless solid, malondialdehyde is a highly reactive compound that occurs as the enol. It is a physiological metabolite, and a marker for oxidative stress.

== Structure and synthesis ==
Malondialdehyde mainly exists as its enol, hydroxyacrolein:

CH_{2}(CHO)_{2} → HOC(H)=CH-CHO

In organic solvents, the cis-isomer is favored, whereas in water the trans-isomer predominates. The equilibrium is rapid and is inconsequential for many purposes.

In the laboratory it can be generated in situ by hydrolysis of its acetal 1,1,3,3-tetramethoxypropane, which is commercially available and shelf-stable, unlike malondialdehyde. Malondialdehyde is easily deprotonated to give the sodium salt of the enolate (m.p. 245 °C).

== Biosynthesis and reactivity ==
Malondialdehyde results from lipid peroxidation of polyunsaturated fatty acids. It is a prominent product in thromboxane A2 synthesis wherein cyclooxygenase 1 or cycloxygenase 2 metabolizes arachidonic acid to prostaglandin H2 by platelets and a wide array of other cell types and tissues. This product is further metabolized by thromboxane synthase to thromboxane A2, 12-hydroxyheptadecatrienoic acid, and malonyldialdehyde. Alternatively, it may rearrange non-enzymatically to a mixture of 8-cis and 8-trans isomers of 12-hydroxyeicosaheptaenoic acid plus malonyldialdehyde (see 12-Hydroxyheptadecatrienoic acid). The degree of lipid peroxidation can be estimated by the amount of malondialdehyde in tissues.

Reactive oxygen species degrade polyunsaturated lipids, forming malondialdehyde. This compound is a reactive aldehyde and is one of the many reactive electrophile species that cause toxic stress in cells and form covalent protein adducts referred to as "advanced lipoxidation end-products" (ALE), in analogy to advanced glycation end-products (AGE). The production of this aldehyde is used as a biomarker to measure the level of oxidative stress in an organism.

Malondialdehyde reacts with deoxyadenosine and deoxyguanosine in DNA, forming DNA adducts, the primary one being M_{1}G, which is mutagenic. The guanidine group of arginine residues condense with malondialdehyde to give 2-aminopyrimidines.

Human ALDH1A1 aldehyde dehydrogenase is capable of oxidizing malondialdehyde.

=== Analysis ===
Malondialdehyde and other thiobarbituric reactive substances (TBARS) condense with two equivalents of thiobarbituric acid to give a fluorescent red derivative that can be assayed spectrophotometrically. 1-Methyl-2-phenylindole is an alternative more selective reagent.

== Hazards and pathology ==
Malondialdehyde is reactive and potentially mutagenic. It has been found in heated edible oils such as sunflower and palm oils.

Corneas of patients with keratoconus and bullous keratopathy have increased levels of malondialdehyde, according to one study. MDA also can be found in tissue sections of joints from patients with osteoarthritis.

Levels of malondialdehyde can be also considered (as a marker of lipid peroxidation) to assess the membrane damage in spermatozoa; this is crucial because oxidative stress affects sperm function by altering membrane fluidity, permeability and impairing sperm functional competence.

== See also ==
- Methylglyoxal
- 4-Hydroxynonenal
- Isoprostane
