= ALDH1B1 =

Protein-coding gene in the species Homo sapiens

Identifiers
- Aliases: ALDH1B1, ALDH5, ALDHX, aldehyde dehydrogenase 1 family member B1
- External IDs: OMIM: 100670; MGI: 1919785; GeneCards: ALDH1B1
Enzyme activity
EC #	BRENDA	ExPASy	KEGG	MetaCyc
1.2.1.3	↗	↗	↗	↗
1.2.1.28	↗	↗	↗	↗
1.2.1.36	↗	↗	↗	↗

Gene location (Human)
Chr.	Chromosome 9 (human)
Band	9p13.1	Start	38,392,702 bp
Band	9p13.1	End	38,398,661 bp

Gene location (Mouse)
Chr.	Chromosome 4 (mouse)
Band	4|4 B1	Start	45,799,022 bp
Band	4|4 B1	End	45,804,604 bp
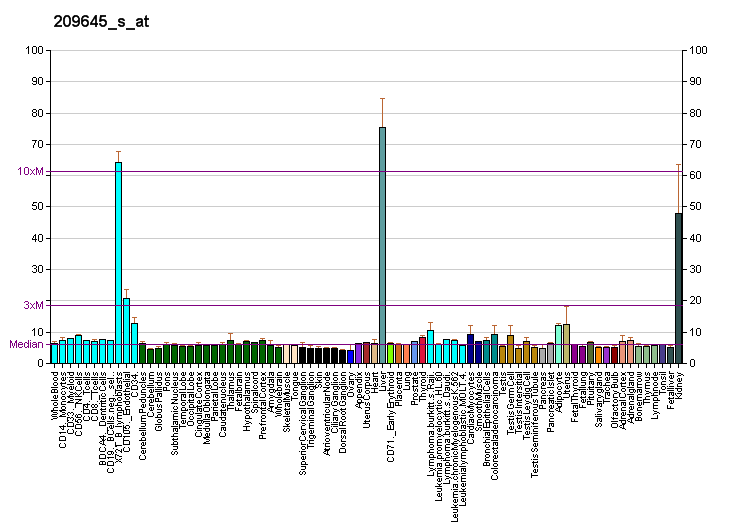

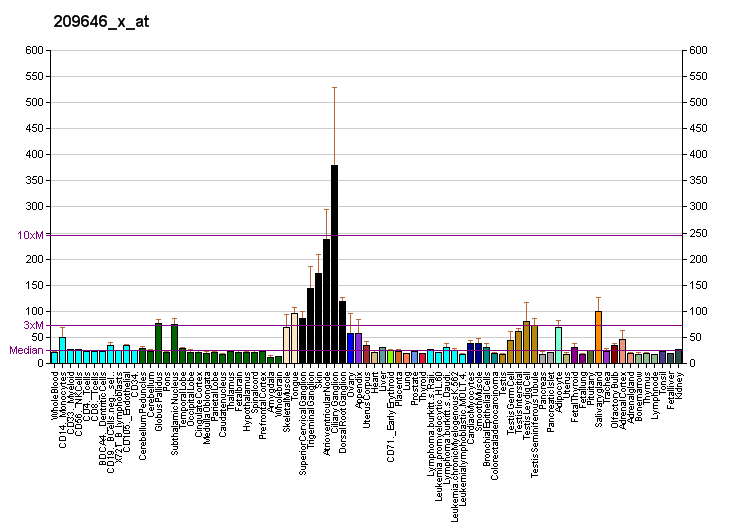
RNA expression pattern
Bgee	Human / Mouse (ortholog); Top expressed in: buccal mucosa cell; right coronary artery; tendon of biceps brachii; popliteal artery; tibial arteries; thoracic aorta; ascending aorta; Descending thoracic aorta; left coronary artery; left uterine tube / Top expressed in: crypt of lieberkuhn of small intestine; epithelium of small intestine; migratory enteric neural crest cell; ileum; jejunum; duodenum; left colon; atrium; intestinal villus; Paneth cell; More reference expression data
BioGPS	More reference expression data
Gene ontology
Molecular function	oxidoreductase activity; aldehyde dehydrogenase (NAD+) activity; NAD binding; oxidoreductase activity, acting on the aldehyde or oxo group of donors, NAD or NADP as acceptor; glyceraldehyde-3-phosphate dehydrogenase (NAD+) (non-phosphorylating) activity
Cellular component	mitochondrial matrix; intracellular membrane-bounded organelle; mitochondrion; nucleoplasm
Biological process	ethanol catabolic process; metabolism; ethanol oxidation; carbohydrate metabolic process
Sources:Amigo / QuickGO
Orthologs
Databases	NCBI: entry; OMA: entry
Species	Human	Mouse
Entrez	219	72535
Ensembl	ENSG00000137124	ENSMUSG00000035561
UniProt	P30837	Q9CZS1
RefSeq (mRNA)	NM_000692	NM_028270
RefSeq (protein)	NP_000683	NP_082546
Location (UCSC)	Chr 9: 38.39 – 38.4 Mb	Chr 4: 45.8 – 45.8 Mb
PubMed search
- Wikidata
View/Edit Human	View/Edit Mouse

Aldehyde dehydrogenase X, mitochondrial is an enzyme that in humans is encoded by the ALDH1B1 gene.

== Function ==
This protein belongs to the aldehyde dehydrogenases family of proteins. Aldehyde dehydrogenase is the second enzyme of the major oxidative pathway of alcohol metabolism. This gene does not contain introns in the coding sequence. The variation of this locus may affect the development of alcohol-related problems.
