= 7,12-Dimethylbenz(a)anthracene =

7,12-Dimethylbenz[a]anthracene
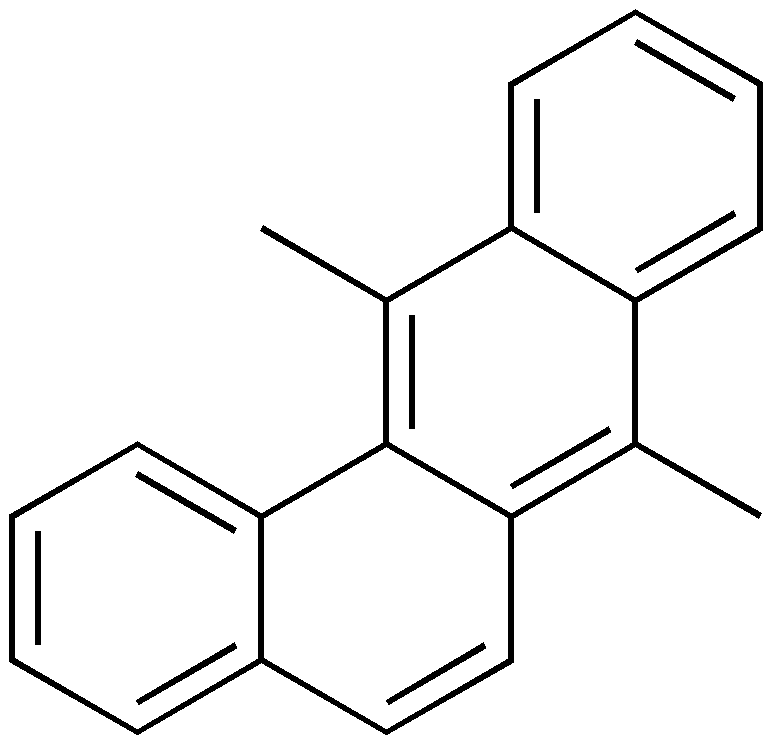

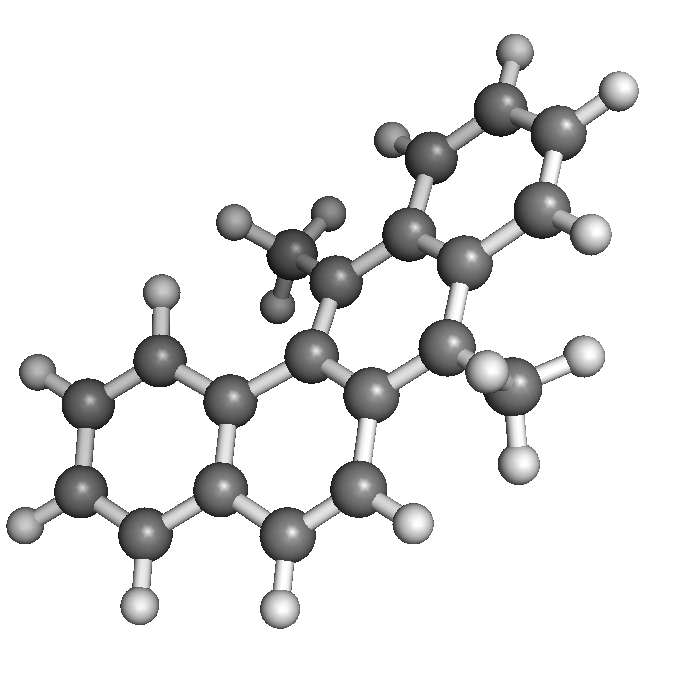

Names
- Preferred IUPAC name 7,12-Dimethyltetraphene
- Other names 7,12-Dimethylbenzo[a]phenanthrene; 7,12-Dimethylbenzanthracene; 7,12-Dimethyltetraphene; 1,4-Dimethyl-2,3-benzophenanthrene

Identifiers
CAS Number	57-97-6
3D model (JSmol)	Interactive image
Beilstein Reference	1912135
ChEBI	CHEBI:254496
ChEMBL	ChEMBL329673
ChemSpider	5779
ECHA InfoCard	100.000.326
Gmelin Reference	263937
KEGG	C19488
PubChem CID	6001
RTECS number	CW3850000
UNII	F05B6S0395
UN number	3077
CompTox Dashboard (EPA)	DTXSID1020510
- InChI: InChI=1S/C20H16/c1-13-16-8-5-6-9-17(16)14(2)20-18(13)12-11-15-7-3-4-10-19(15)20/h3-12H,1-2H3 Key: ARSRBNBHOADGJU-UHFFFAOYSA-N; InChI=1/C20H16/c1-13-16-8-5-6-9-17(16)14(2)20-18(13)12-11-15-7-3-4-10-19(15)20/h3-12H,1-2H3 Key: ARSRBNBHOADGJU-UHFFFAOYAX
- SMILES: c32c(c1ccccc1c(c2ccc4c3cccc4)C)C

Properties
Chemical formula	C_{20}H_{16}
Molar mass	256.348 g·mol^{−1}
Melting point	122 to 123 °C (252 to 253 °F; 395 to 396 K)

Hazards
- Occupational safety and health (OHS/OSH)
Main hazards	T (Toxic)
- GHS labelling
Pictograms	(GHS07: Exclamation mark) (GHS08: Health hazard)
Signal word	Danger
Hazard statements	H302, H350
Precautionary statements	P201, P202, P264, P270, P281, P301+P312, P308+P313, P330, P405, P501
NFPA 704 (fire diamond)	2 0 0
- Except where otherwise noted, data are given for materials in their standard state (at 25 °C [77 °F], 100 kPa). verify (what is ?) Infobox references

7,12-Dimethylbenz[a]anthracene (DMBA) is an immunosuppressor and a powerful organ-specific laboratory carcinogen. DMBA is widely used in many research laboratories studying cancer. DMBA serves as a tumor initiator. Tumor promotion can be induced with treatments of 12-O-tetradecanoylphorbol-13-acetate (TPA) in some models of two-stage carcinogenesis. This allows for a greatly accelerated rate of tumor growth, making many cancer studies possible.
