= Adduct =

Product of direct addition of two or more distinct molecules

In chemistry, an adduct (from Latin adductus 'drawn toward'; alternatively, a contraction of "addition product") is a product of a direct addition of two or more distinct molecules, resulting in a single reaction product containing all atoms of all components. The resultant is considered a distinct molecular species. Examples include the addition of sodium bisulfite to an aldehyde to give a sulfonate. It can be considered as a single product resulting from the direct combination of different molecules which comprises all atoms of the reactant molecules.

Adducts often form between Lewis acids and Lewis bases. A good example is the formation of adducts between the Lewis acid borane and the oxygen atom in the Lewis bases, tetrahydrofuran (THF): BH_{3}·O(CH_{2})_{4} or diethyl ether: BH_{3}·O(CH_{3}CH_{2})_{2}. Many Lewis acids and Lewis bases reacting in the gas phase or in non-aqueous solvents to form adducts have been examined in the ECW model. Trimethylborane, trimethyltin chloride and bis(hexafluoroacetylacetonato)copper(II) are examples of Lewis acids that form adducts which exhibit steric effects. For example: trimethyltin chloride, when reacting with diethyl ether, exhibits steric repulsion between the methyl groups on the tin and the ethyl groups on oxygen. But when the Lewis base is tetrahydrofuran, steric repulsion is reduced. The ECW model can provide a measure of these steric effects.

Ball and stick diagram of the Lewis adduct between BH_{3} and THF
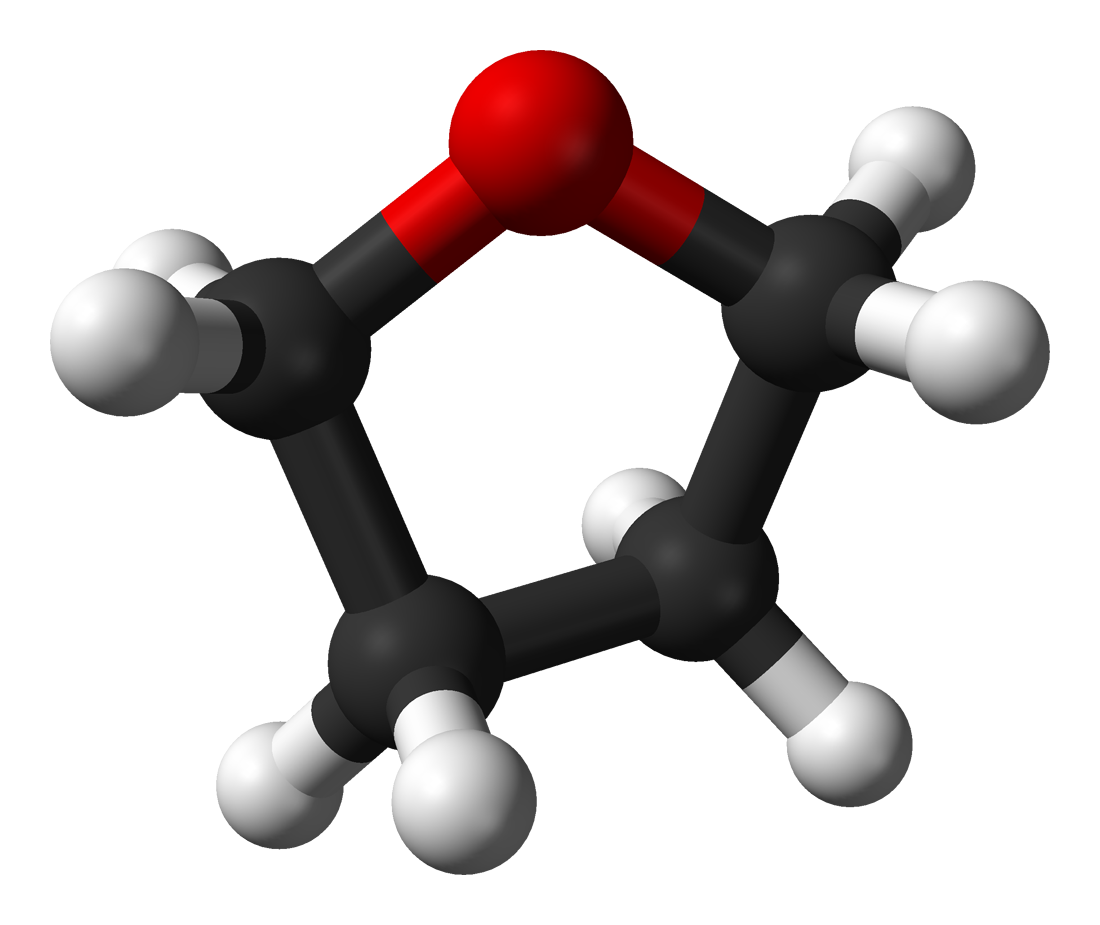
THF molecule

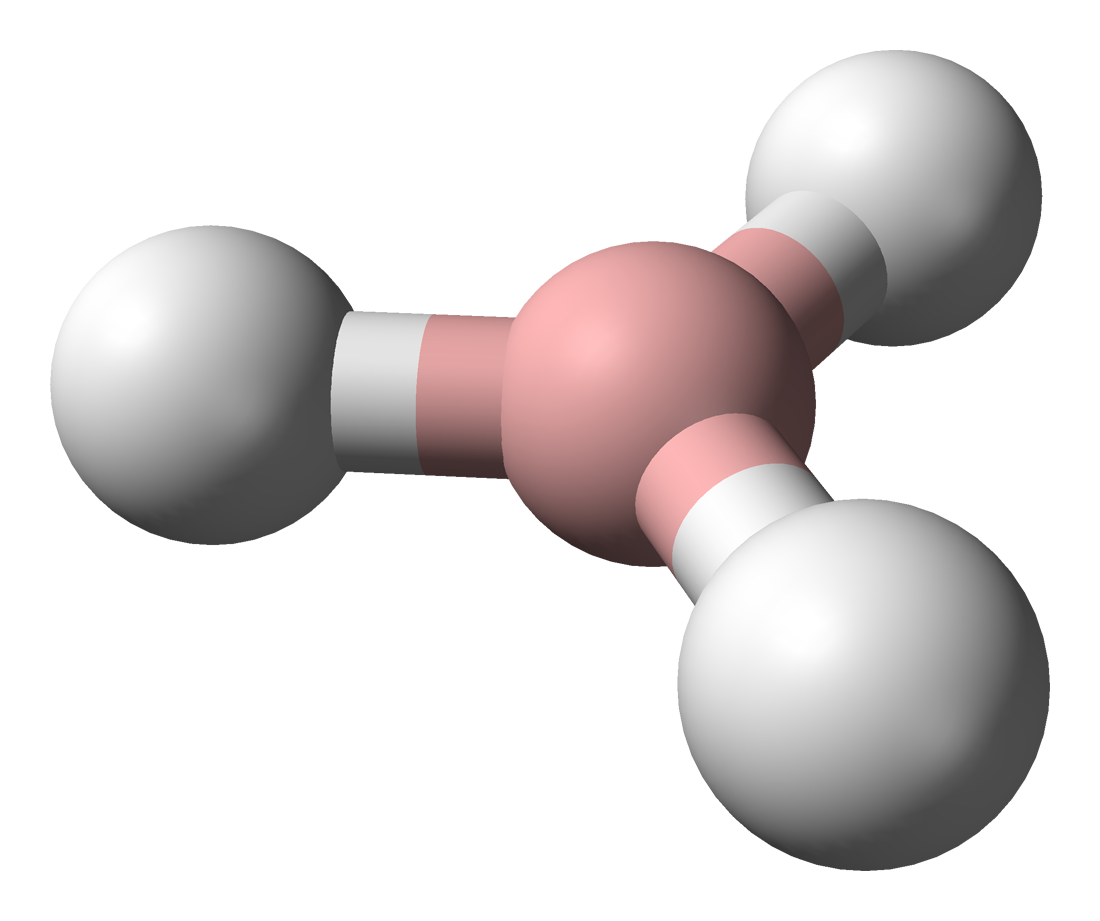
BH_{3} molecule

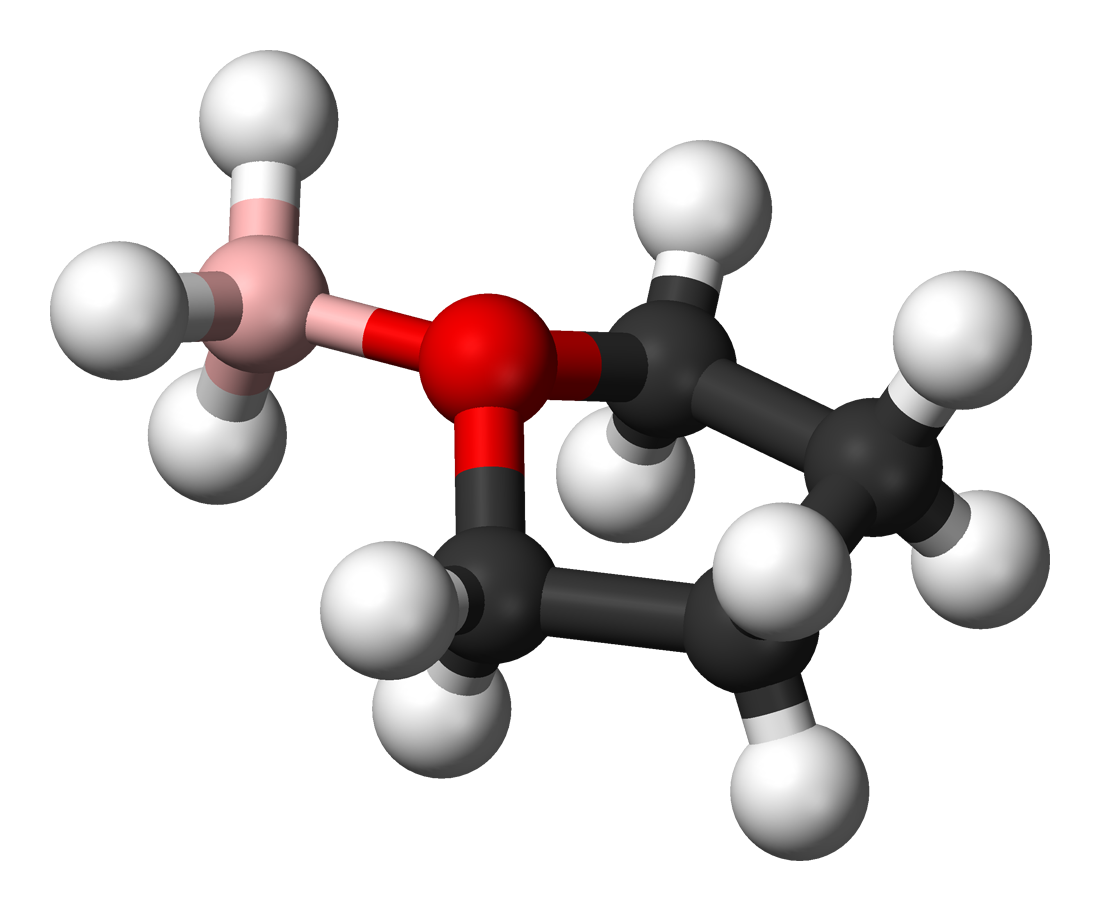
Lewis adduct between BH_{3} and THF

Compounds or mixtures that cannot form an adduct because of steric hindrance are called frustrated Lewis pairs.

Adducts are not necessarily molecular in nature. A good example from solid-state chemistry is the adducts of ethylene or carbon monoxide of CuAlCl_{4}. The latter is a solid with an extended lattice structure. Upon formation of the adduct, a new extended phase is formed in which the gas molecules are incorporated (inserted) as ligands of the copper atoms within the structure. This reaction can also be considered a reaction between a base and a Lewis acid where the copper atom plays the electron-receiving role and the pi electrons of the gas molecule play the electron-donating role.

== Adduct ions ==
An adduct ion is formed from a precursor ion and contains all of the constituent atoms of that ion as well as additional atoms or molecules. Adduct ions are often formed in a mass spectrometer ion source.

== See also ==
- Adductomics
- DNA adduct
