= Lipid peroxidation =

Reaction(s) leading to production of (phospho)lipid peroxides

Lipid peroxidation, or lipid oxidation, is a complex chemical process that leads to oxidative degradation of lipids, resulting in the formation of peroxide and hydroperoxide derivatives. It occurs when free radicals, specifically reactive oxygen species (ROS), interact with lipids within cell membranes, typically polyunsaturated fatty acids (PUFAs) as they have carbon–carbon double bonds. This reaction leads to the formation of lipid radicals, collectively referred to as lipid peroxides or lipid oxidation products (LOPs), which in turn react with other oxidizing agents, leading to a chain reaction that results in oxidative stress and cell damage.

In pathology and medicine, lipid peroxidation plays a role in cell damage which has broadly been implicated in the pathogenesis of various diseases and disease states, including ageing, whereas in food science lipid peroxidation is one of many pathways to rancidity.

== Reaction mechanism ==
Simplified pathway for lipid autoxidation: Initiated by hydroxyl radical, which abstracts hydrogen and forms a pentadienyl radical (only one resonance structure shown). This radical adds O_{2} to give hydroperoxyl radical (red). In a propagation step, this hydroperoxyl radical abstracts an H^{+} atom from a new diene, generating a new pentadienyl radical and a hydroperoxide (blue).

The chemical reaction of lipid peroxidation consists of three phases: initiation, propagation, and termination.

In the initiation phase, a pro-oxidant hydroxyl radical (OH•) abstracts the hydrogen at the allylic position (–CH_{2}–CH=CH_{2}) or methine bridge (=CH−) on the stable lipid substrate, typically a polyunsaturated fatty acid (PUFA), to form the lipid radical (L•) and water (H_{2}O).

In the propagation phase, the lipid radical (L•) reacts with molecular oxygen (O_{2}) to form a lipid hydroperoxyl radical (LOO•). The lipid hydroperoxyl radical (LOO•) can further abstract hydrogen from a new PUFA substrate, forming another lipid radical (L•) and now finally a lipid hydroperoxide (LOOH).

The lipid hydroperoxyl radical (LOO•) can also undergo a variety of reactions to produce new radicals.

The additional lipid radical (L•) continues the chain reaction, whilst the lipid hydroperoxide (LOOH) is the primary end product. The formation of lipid radicals is sensitive to the kinetic isotope effect. Reinforced lipids in the membrane can suppress the chain reaction of lipid peroxidation.

The termination step can vary, in both its actual chemical reaction and when it will occur. Lipid peroxidation is a self-propagating chain reaction and will proceed until the lipid substrate is consumed and the last two remaining radicals combine, or a reaction which terminates it occurs. Termination can occur when two lipid hydroperoxyl radicals (LOO•) react to form peroxide and oxygen (O_{2}). Termination can also occur when the concentration of radical species is high.

The primary products of lipid peroxidation are lipid hydroperoxides (LOOH).

=== Arachidonic acid as a substrate ===
When arachidonic acid is a substrate, isomers of hydroperoxyeicosatetraenoic acid (HPETEs) and hydroxyeicosatetraenoic acids (HETEs) are formed.

== Role of antioxidants ==
Free radical mechanisms in tissue injury. Lipid peroxidation induced by xenobiotics and the subsequent detoxification by cellular enzymes (termination).

Antioxidants play a crucial role in mitigating lipid peroxidation by neutralizing free radicals, thereby halting radical chain reactions. Key antioxidants include vitamin C and vitamin E. Additionally, enzymes including superoxide dismutase, catalase, and peroxidase contribute to the oxidation response by reducing the presence of hydrogen peroxide, which is a prevalent precursor of the hydroxyl radical (OH•).

As an example, vitamin E can donate a hydrogen atom to the lipid hydroperoxyl radical (LOO•) to form a vitamin E radical, which further reacts with another lipid hydroperoxyl radical (LOO•) forming non-radical products.

== Medical implications ==
Phototherapy may cause lipid peroxidation, leading to the rupture of red blood cell cell membranes.

End-products of lipid peroxidation may be mutagenic and carcinogenic. For instance, the end-product MDA reacts with deoxyadenosine and deoxyguanosine in DNA, forming DNA adducts to them, primarily M_{1}G.

Reactive aldehydes can also form Michael adducts or Schiff bases with thiol or amine groups in amino acid side chains. Thus, they are able to inactivate sensitive proteins through electrophilic stress.

The toxicity of lipid hydroperoxides to animals is best illustrated by the lethal phenotype of glutathione peroxidase 4 (GPX4) knockout mice. These animals do not survive past embryonic day 8, indicating that the removal of lipid hydroperoxides is essential for mammalian life.

It is unclear whether dietary lipid peroxides are bioavailable and play a role in disease, as a healthy human body has protective mechanisms in place against such hazards.

== Tests ==
Certain diagnostic tests are available for the quantification of the end-products of lipid peroxidation, to be specific, malondialdehyde (MDA). The most commonly used test is called a TBARS Assay (thiobarbituric acid reactive substances assay). Thiobarbituric acid reacts with malondialdehyde to yield a fluorescent product. However, there are other sources of malondialdehyde, so this test is not completely specific for lipid peroxidation.

== See also ==
- Autoxidation
- Rancidification
