= CYP26 family =

Cytochrome P450, family 26, also known as CYP26, is a mammal cytochrome P450 monooxygenase family found in human genome. There are three members in the human genome, CYP26A1, CYP26B1 and CYP26C1, which are involved in Vitamin A/Retinoic acid metabolism. Synteny mapping of CYP26 family members showing linkages to CYP16 family members of many invertebrates, means the tetrapod's CYP26 may evolved from CYP16 of fish.
