= Retinal dehydrogenase =

retinal dehydrogenase
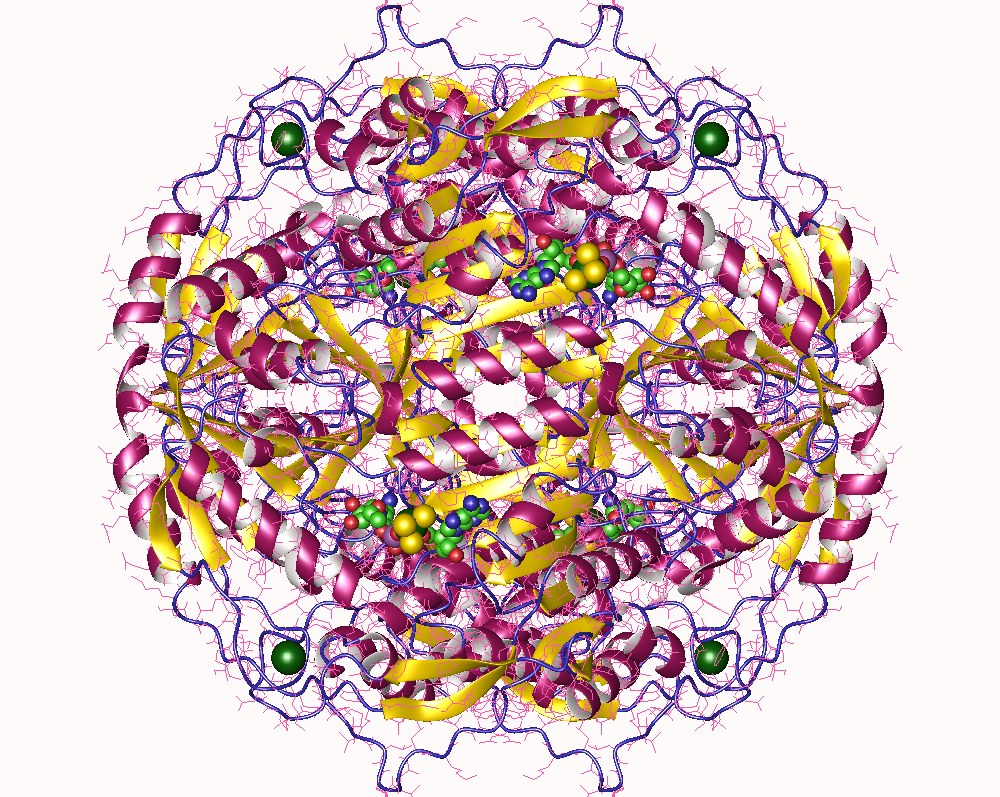
- retinal dehydrogenase inhibited by Yb

Identifiers
- EC no.: 1.2.1.36
- CAS no.: 37250-99-0

Databases
- IntEnz: IntEnz view
- BRENDA: BRENDA entry
- ExPASy: NiceZyme view
- KEGG: KEGG entry
- MetaCyc: metabolic pathway
- PRIAM: profile
- PDB structures: RCSB PDB PDBe PDBsum
- Gene Ontology: AmiGO / QuickGO
Search
- PMC: articles
- PubMed: articles
- NCBI: proteins

In enzymology, a retinal dehydrogenase, also known as retinaldehyde dehydrogenase (RALDH), catalyzes the chemical reaction converting retinal to retinoic acid. This enzyme belongs to the family of oxidoreductases, specifically the class acting on aldehyde or oxo- donor groups with nicotinamide adenine dinucleotide (NAD^{+}) or nicotinamide adenine dinucleotide phosphate (NADP^{+}) as acceptor groups, the systematic name being retinal:NAD^{+} oxidoreductase. This enzyme participates in retinol metabolism. The general scheme for the reaction catalyzed by this enzyme is:

retinal
+ NAD^{+}
H_{2}O
H^{+}
H_{2}O
H^{+}
retinoic acid
+ NADH

== Structure ==
Retinal dehydrogenase is a tetramer of identical units, consisting of a dimer of dimers. Retinal dehydrogenase monomers are composed of three domains: a nucleotide-binding domain, a tetramerization domain, and a catalytic domain. The dimer can be pictured as an "X" with the dimers forming upper and lower halves that cross over each other. Interestingly, the nucleotide-binding domain of retinal dehydrogenase contains 5 instead of the usual 6 β-strands in the Rossman fold. This appears to be conserved across many aldehyde dehydrogenases. The tetramerization domains lie equatorially along the "X" and the nucleotide binding regions appear on the tips of the "X". Nearby the tetramerization domain lies a 12 Å deep tunnel that gives the substrate access to the key catalytic regions. Residues near the C-terminal end of the catalytic domain have been found to impart specificity in other aldehyde dehydrogenases. Common to many aldehyde dehydrogenases is a catalytic cysteine, which was found to be present in ALDH1A2 (aka RALDH2), one of the retinal dehydrogenase for which the structure has been solved.

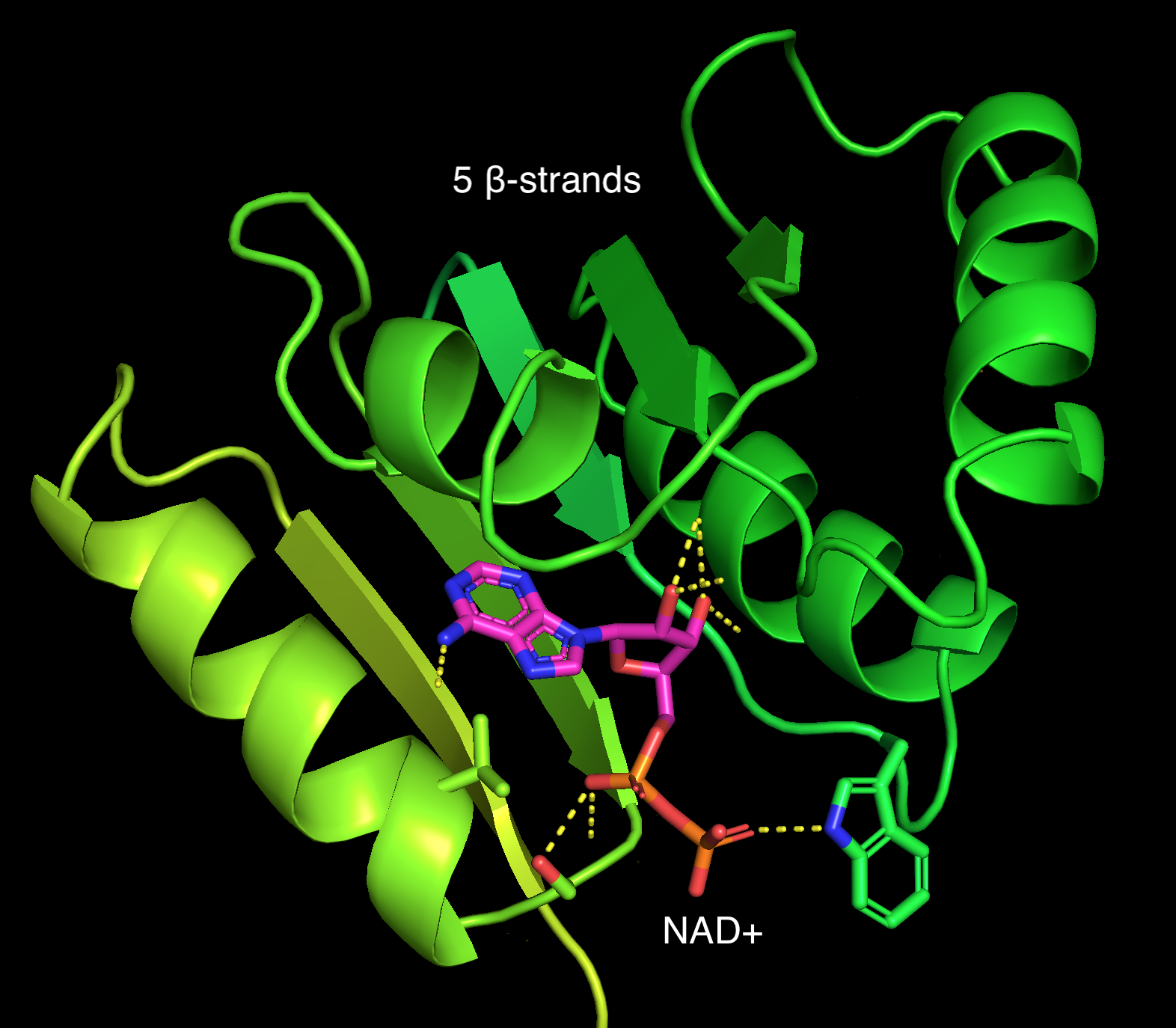
A depiction of the Rossman fold in retinal dehydrogenase (PDB 1BI9) highlighting the unique 5 β-strands instead of the traditional 6. NAD^{+} shown in pink for clarity.

== Specificity ==
Retinal dehydrogenases are a subset of a larger family called aldehyde dehydrogenases. In particular, the three enzymes of the ALDH1A subfamily ALDH1A1 (aka RALDH1), ALDH1A2 (aka RALDH2), and ALDH1A3 (aka RALDH3) are known to preferentially act on retinal. While at least 19 different varieties of aldehyde dehydrogenases have been found in humans, many of them (like ALDH2) show little affinity for retinal. The size of the entrance tunnel to the enzyme active site appears to provide the specificity observed in ALDH1A1 for retinal as a substrate. The solvent-accessible diameter of the entrance tunnel is 150 Å^{3} in ALDH1A1, so the relatively large retinal can be accommodated while the solvent accessible diameter in ALDH2 is only 20 Å^{3} which limits accessibility to retinal but amply accommodates acetaldehyde.

== Mechanism ==
The proposed mechanism of retinal dehydrogenase begins with a key cysteine residue in the active site attacking the aldehyde group in retinal to form a thiohemiacetal intermediate. Then, a hydride shift is facilitated by the enzyme to form NADH and a thioester intermediate. This hydride shift has been shown to be stereospecific in a subset (class 3) of retinal dehydrogenases. The thioester intermediate is then attacked by a water molecule, which is made more nucleophilic by a glutamate residue that lies near the active site. There has been some debate as to whether the glutamate residue near the active site acts as a general base during the reaction or whether it is more limited and merely deprotonates the catalytic cysteine to make the cysteine more nucleophilic. Kinetic studies have supported this mechanism by showing that the reaction follows an ordered sequential path with NAD^{+} binding first which is followed by the binding of retinal, the catalytic breakdown of retinal to retinoic acid, the release of retinoic acid, and finally the release of NADH.

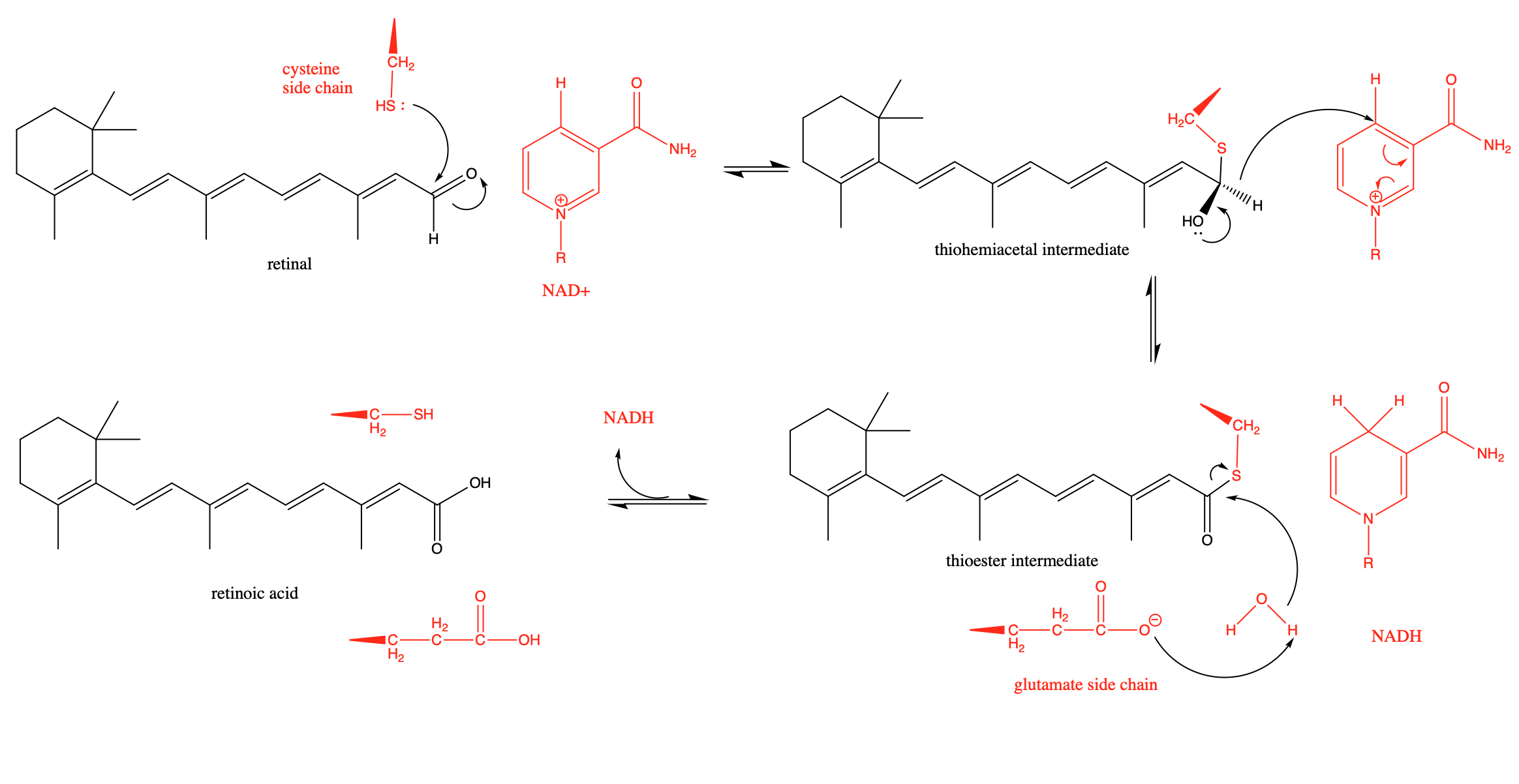
The mechanism of retinal dehydrogenase. NAD^{+} and protein side chains shown in red for clarity.

== Regulation ==
Some of the strategies for regulating retinal dehydrogenases are only now becoming more clear after in vivo regulation remained mysterious for some time, though much of the current research on regulation has focused on the modulation of gene expression rather than direct protein regulation. Dendritic cells in the gut help in modulating immune tolerance through the activity of retinal dehydrogenase; expression in these cells may be driven by a TNF receptor, 4-1-BB. It was also shown that the expression of a certain retinal dehydrogenase found in humans, retinal short-chain dehydrogenase/reductase (retSDR1), is increased by tumor-suppressor proteins p53 and p63, suggesting that retSDR1 may have tumor-preventing activities. Expression of retinal dehydrogenase types 1 and 2 genes is enhanced by the addition of cholesterol or cholesterol derivatives. Disulfiram is a drug used to artificially regulate aldehyde dehydrogenase activity in patients with alcoholism by inhibiting the activity of aldehyde dehydrogenases, though it is not specific to retinal dehydrogenase. Other exogenous molecules have also been found to inhibit retinal dehydrogenase activity including nitrofen, 4-biphenyl carboxylic acid, bisdiamine, and SB-210661.

== Clinical significance ==
Retinal dehydrogenase plays a key role in the biosynthesis of retinoic acid, which in turn acts in cell signaling pathways. Retinoic acid is distinct from other cell signaling molecules in that it diffuses into the nucleus and binds directly to gene targets via retinoic acid receptors. This retinoic acid signaling pathway also appears to be unique to chordates, as suggested by the presence of retinal dehydrogenases exclusively in chordates. Retinoic acid signaling appears to control developmental processes like neurogenesis, cardiogenesis, forelimb bud development, foregut development, and eye development. Retinoic acid signaling is also important for maintaining adult neuronal and epithelium cell type. Retinoic acid is generated in organisms by first oxidizing retinol (Vitamin A) to retinal with an alcohol dehydrogenase. Then, a retinal dehydrogenase oxidizes retinal to retinoic acid. The production of retinoic acid from vitamin A must be tightly controlled as high levels of retinoic acid and vitamin A can lead to toxic effects, while vitamin A deficiency leads to its own issues in development. This provides a rationale for many of the transcriptional regulatory strategies discussed earlier.

== Isoforms ==
Different isoforms of retinal dehydrogenase exist and play a key role in development, as the types are differentially expressed inside a developing embryo. The enzyme retinal dehydrogenase type-2 (ALDH1A2 or RALDH2) catalyzes much of the retinoic acid formation during development, but not all. ALDH1A2 is crucial for development midgestation and helps drive neural, heart, lung, and forelimb development; it is also responsible for all retinoic acid development during certain periods of midgestation. Later in development, retinal dehydrogenase type-1 (ALDH1A1 or RALDH1) begins activity in the dorsal pit of the retina and retinal dehydrogenase type-3 (ALDH1A3 or RALDH3) becomes active in the olfactory pit, ventral retina, and urinary tract. ALDH1A2 gene knockouts are fatal in mice during development since the brain cannot develop normally. ALDH1A3 gene knockout is fatal at birth in mice since nasal passages are not properly developed and instead are blocked. ALDH1A1 knockouts are not fatal and, interestingly, have been shown to be protective against diet-induced obesity in mice in a retinoid-independent manner.
