= ALDH1A2 =

Protein-coding gene in the species Homo sapiens

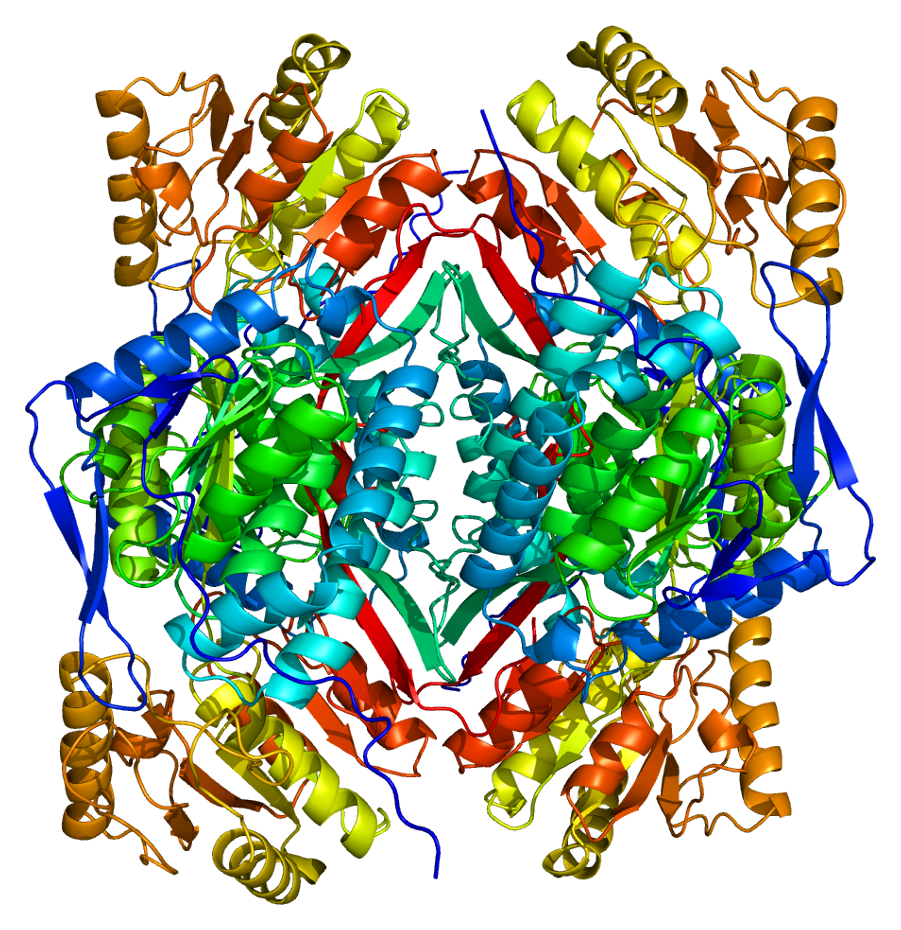

Identifiers
- Aliases: ALDH1A2, RALDH(II), RALDH2, RALDH2-T, aldehyde dehydrogenase 1 family member A2
- External IDs: OMIM: 603687; MGI: 107928; GeneCards: ALDH1A2
Available structures
PDB	Ortholog search: PDBe RCSB
PDB	List of PDB id codes 4X2Q
Enzyme activity
EC #	BRENDA	ExPASy	KEGG	MetaCyc
1.2.1.36	↗	↗	↗	↗

Gene location (Human)
Chr.	Chromosome 15 (human)
Band	15q21.3	Start	57,953,424 bp
Band	15q21.3	End	58,497,866 bp

Gene location (Mouse)
Chr.	Chromosome 9 (mouse)
Band	9 D|9 39.85 cM	Start	71,123,071 bp
Band	9 D|9 39.85 cM	End	71,203,525 bp
RNA expression pattern
Bgee	Human / Mouse (ortholog); Top expressed in: germinal epithelium; decidua; sperm; seminal vesicula; secondary oocyte; right uterine tube; endometrium; parietal pleura; tail of epididymis; body of uterus / Top expressed in: vas deferens; primitive streak; vestibular sensory epithelium; spermatocyte; stria vascularis; gastrula; optic nerve; uterus; genital tubercle; seminiferous tubule; More reference expression data
BioGPS	n/a
Gene ontology
Molecular function	oxidoreductase activity; aldehyde dehydrogenase (NAD+) activity; retinal binding; retinal dehydrogenase activity; 3-chloroallyl aldehyde dehydrogenase activity; oxidoreductase activity, acting on the aldehyde or oxo group of donors, NAD or NADP as acceptor
Cellular component	cytoplasm; cytosol; perinuclear region of cytoplasm
Biological process	cellular response to retinoic acid; proximal/distal pattern formation; response to cytokine; pituitary gland development; response to estradiol; 9-cis-retinoic acid biosynthetic process; neural crest cell development; cardiac muscle tissue development; lung development; kidney development; retinol metabolic process; heart morphogenesis; hindbrain development; retinoic acid metabolic process; retinal metabolic process; embryonic camera-type eye development; retinoic acid biosynthetic process; response to vitamin A; face development; positive regulation of gene expression; retinoic acid receptor signaling pathway; blood vessel development; embryonic limb morphogenesis; ureter maturation; neural tube development; neuron differentiation; positive regulation of cell population proliferation; regulation of endothelial cell proliferation; positive regulation of apoptotic process; pancreas development; determination of bilateral symmetry; vitamin A metabolic process; liver development; forebrain development; camera-type eye development; metabolism; morphogenesis of embryonic epithelium; embryonic digestive tract development; embryonic forelimb morphogenesis; anterior/posterior pattern specification; negative regulation of cell population proliferation; midgut development; retinoic acid receptor signaling pathway involved in somitogenesis; protein homotetramerization
Sources:Amigo / QuickGO
Orthologs
Databases	NCBI: entry; OMA: entry
Species	Human	Mouse
Entrez	8854	19378
Ensembl	ENSG00000128918	ENSMUSG00000013584
UniProt	O94788	Q62148
RefSeq (mRNA)	NM_170697; NM_001206897; NM_003888; NM_170696	NM_009022
RefSeq (protein)	NP_001193826; NP_003879; NP_733797; NP_733798	NP_033048
Location (UCSC)	Chr 15: 57.95 – 58.5 Mb	Chr 9: 71.12 – 71.2 Mb
PubMed search
- Wikidata
View/Edit Human	View/Edit Mouse

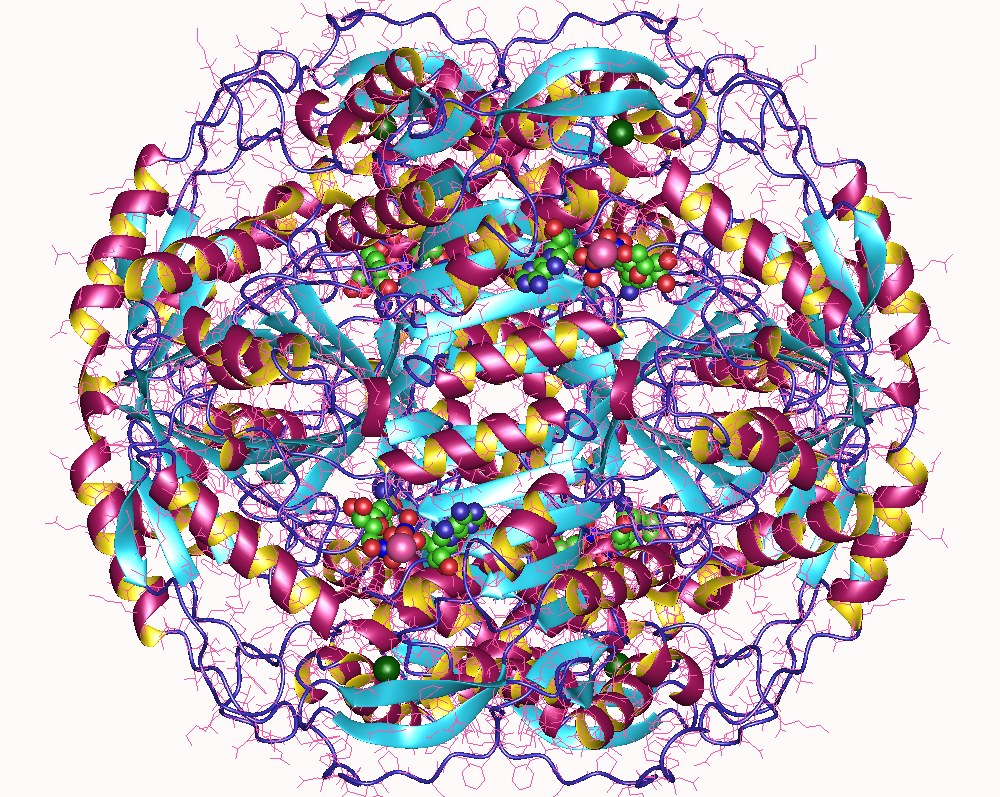
ALDH1A2 expressed from Aldehyde Dehydrogenase (ALDH)

Aldehyde dehydrogenase 1 family, member A2, also known as ALDH1A2 or retinaldehyde dehydrogenase 2 (RALDH2), is an enzyme that in humans is encoded by the ALDH1A2 gene.

== Function ==
ALDH1a2 belongs to the aldehyde dehydrogenase family of proteins, and specifically the ALDH1 family. The product of this gene, ALDH1a2, is an enzyme that catalyzes the synthesis of all-trans retinoic acid (RA) from retinaldehyde in a NAD-dependent manner. Retinoic acid, the active derivative of vitamin A (retinol), is a retinoid nuclear receptor ligand that functions in developing and adult tissues.

ALDH1a2 is critical to fetal development by activating the RAR nuclear receptors. Studies of ALDH1a2 in mice suggest that this enzyme and the cytochrome CYP26A1 enzyme coordinate local embryonic retinoic acid levels that facilitate posterior organ development and prevent spina bifida.

In adult tissues, ALDH1a2 is known to regulate immune tolerance in the colon and other mucosal tissues by generating retinoic acid as a paracrine signal to CD4 T cells. ALDH1a2 also works in conjunction with ALDH1a1 to establish sufficient retinoic acid levels in the testes to support spermatogenesis. Due to its role in suppressing immune cells as well as its unique amplification in T cell Acute Lymphoblastic Leukemia (T-ALL), ALDH1a2 has been suggested as a target for cancer therapy.

== Clinical significance ==
=== Involvement in T-ALL ===
ALDH1A2 is abnormally amplified in more than half of instances of T-cell acute lymphoblastic leukemia (T-ALL). T-ALL is a leukemia that arises from immature T-cell precursors and is an aggressive form of cancer that primarily affects children but also occurs in adults. T-ALL is caused when one or more genes encoding transcription factors including TAL1, TLX1, HOXA, TAL2, LYL1, LMO1, LMO2, or NKX3 are genetically fused to other chromosomal regions. ALDH1A2 is one of the recognized downstream targets of TAL1 fusion genes which works by binding to the intronic regulatory element of ALDH1a2, thereby inducing a T-ALL specific isoform with enzymatic activity. TAL-1 positive T-ALL accounts for approximately 40-60% of all primary T-ALL cases. According to researchers' data, depletion of ALDH1A2 in T-ALL led to reduced cell viability in T-cell lines and caused apoptosis.

=== Involvement in solid tumors ===
ALDH1a2 is not expressed in most cancer cells and comparison studies reveal that it is often expressed at lower levels in tumors compared to adjacent normal tissues. This contrasts with the related family members ALDH1a1 and ALDH1a3. For instance, the ALDH1A2 promoter region is hypermethylated in primary prostate tumors compared with normal prostate specimens, resulting in lower ALDH1a2 expression in prostate cancers. In contrast to tumor cells, ALDH1a2 is expressed in many monocyte-derived populations known to reside in tumors such as alternatively activated macrophages and other antigen presenting cells. Glioblastoma-associated macrophages highly express ALDH1A2 when compared to other ALDH family enzymes and this higher expression is associated with tumor recurrence.

=== Population genetic studies ===
ALDH1a2 is key regulator of development due to its role in producing retinoic acid in the developing fetus. Key organs affected by ALDH1a2 during development include the heart and neural tube. Several small population studies have examined a link between single nucleotide polymorphisms in the ALDH1A2 gene and various disease states. In a case control study of 103 patients with congenital heart disease, ALDH1a2 SNPs were identified in patients, but the levels did not significantly differ from case controls suggesting known ALDH1a2 polymorphisms do not affect risk of congenital heart disease.

In contrast, SNPs found in ALDH1a2 introns show statistically significant associations with hand osteoarthritis. Extensive characterization of these loci show that SNPs associated with hand osteoarthritis result in quantitative reductions of ALDH1a2 expression, suggesting that ALDH1a2 protects against synovial inflammation.
