= Vitamin A =

Essential nutrient

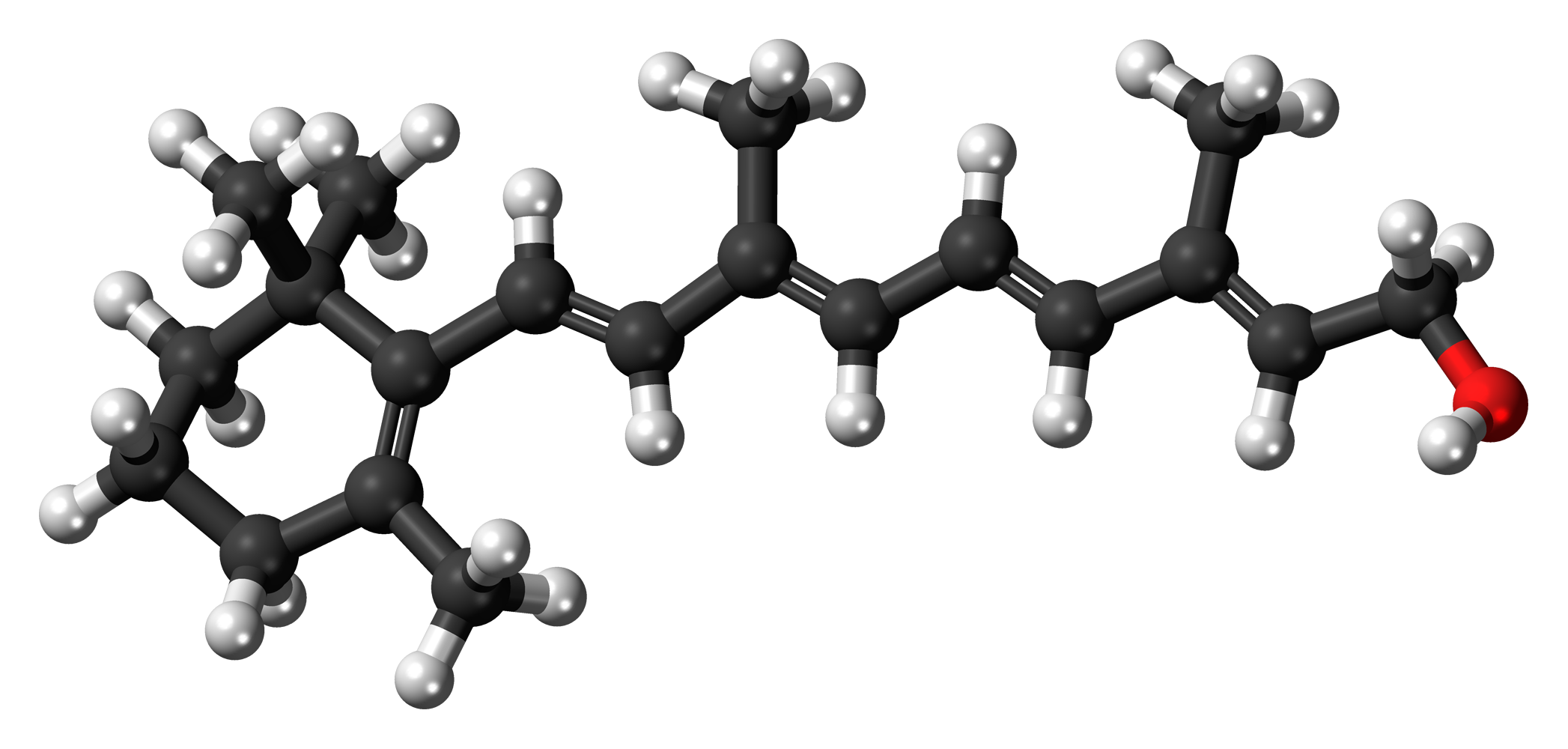
- Retinol (depicted) and retinal play a biological role in vision, but most of the effects of vitamin A are exerted by retinoic acid, which binds to nuclear receptors and regulates gene transcription.

Clinical data
- AHFS/Drugs.com: Monograph
- License data: US DailyMed: Retinol
- Routes of administration: By mouth, intramuscular
- Drug class: Vitamin
- ATC code: A11CA01 (WHO) D10AD02 (WHO), R01AX02 (WHO), S01XA02 (WHO)

Legal status
- Legal status: US: OTC / Rx-only

Identifiers
- IUPAC name: (2E,4E,6E,8E)-3,7-dimethyl-9-(2,6,6-trimethylcyclohex-1-en-1-yl)nona-2,4,6,8-tetraen-1-ol
- CAS Number: 68-26-8; mixture: 11103-57-4
- PubChem CID: 1071
- IUPHAR/BPS: 4053
- ChemSpider: 393012
- UNII: G2SH0XKK91; mixture: 81G40H8B0T
- ChEBI: CHEBI:17336
- ChEMBL: ChEMBL986
- ECHA InfoCard: 100.031.195

Chemical and physical data
- Formula: C_{20}H_{30}O
- Molar mass: 286.459 g·mol^{−1}
- 3D model (JSmol): Interactive image
- Melting point: 62–64 °C (144–147 °F)
- Boiling point: 137–138 °C (279–280 °F) (10^{−6} mm Hg)
- SMILES: OC/C=C(C)/C=C/C=C(C)/C=C/C1=C(C)/CCCC1(C)C
- InChI: InChI=1S/C20H30O/c1-16(8-6-9-17(2)13-15-21)11-12-19-18(3)10-7-14-20(19,4)5/h6,8-9,11-13,21H,7,10,14-15H2,1-5H3/b9-6+,12-11+,16-8+,17-13+; Key:FPIPGXGPPPQFEQ-OVSJKPMPSA-N

Vitamin A is a fat-soluble vitamin that is an essential nutrient. The term "vitamin A" encompasses a group of chemically related organic compounds that includes retinol, retinyl esters, and several provitamin (precursor) carotenoids, most notably β-carotene (beta-carotene). Vitamin A has multiple functions: growth during embryo development, maintaining the immune system, and healthy vision. For aiding vision specifically, it combines with the protein opsin to form rhodopsin, the light-absorbing molecule necessary for both low-light (scotopic vision) and color vision.

Vitamin A occurs as two principal forms in foods: 1) retinoids, found in animal-sourced foods, either as retinol or bound to a fatty acid to become a retinyl ester, and 2) the carotenoids α-carotene (alpha-carotene), β-carotene, γ-carotene (gamma-carotene), and the xanthophyll beta-cryptoxanthin (all of which contain β-ionone rings) that function as provitamin A in herbivore and omnivore animals which possess the enzymes that cleave and convert provitamin carotenoids to retinol. Some carnivore species lack this enzyme. The other carotenoids do not have retinoid activity.

Dietary retinol is absorbed from the digestive tract via passive diffusion. Unlike retinol, β-carotene is taken up by enterocytes by the membrane transporter protein scavenger receptor B1 (SCARB1), which is upregulated in times of vitamin A deficiency (VAD). Retinol is stored in lipid droplets in the liver. A high capacity for long-term storage of retinol means that well-nourished humans can go months on a vitamin A-deficient diet, while maintaining blood levels in the normal range. Only when the liver stores are nearly depleted will signs and symptoms of deficiency show. Retinol is reversibly converted to retinal, then irreversibly to retinoic acid, which activates hundreds of genes.

Vitamin A deficiency is common in developing countries, especially in Sub-Saharan Africa and Southeast Asia. Deficiency can occur at any age but is most common in pre-school age children and pregnant women, the latter due to a need to transfer retinol to the fetus. Vitamin A deficiency is estimated to affect approximately one-third of children under the age of five around the world, resulting in hundreds of thousands of cases of blindness and deaths from childhood diseases because of immune system failure. Reversible night blindness is an early indicator of low vitamin A status. Plasma retinol is used as a biomarker to confirm vitamin A deficiency. Breast milk retinol can indicate a deficiency in nursing mothers. Neither of these measures indicates the status of liver reserves.

The European Union and various countries have set recommendations for dietary intake, and upper limits for safe intake. Vitamin A toxicity also referred to as hypervitaminosis A, occurs when there is too much vitamin A accumulating in the body. Symptoms may include nervous system effects, liver abnormalities, fatigue, muscle weakness, bone and skin changes, and others. The adverse effects of both acute and chronic toxicity are reversed after consumption of high dose supplements is stopped.

== Definition ==
Vitamin A is a fat-soluble vitamin, a category that also includes vitamins D, E and K. The vitamin encompasses several chemically related naturally occurring compounds or metabolites, i.e., vitamers, that all contain a β-ionone ring. The primary dietary form is retinol, which may have a fatty acid molecule attached, creating a retinyl ester, when stored in the liver. Retinol – the transport and storage form of vitamin A – is interconvertible with retinal, catalyzed to retinal by retinol dehydrogenases and back to retinol by retinaldehyde reductases.

retinal + NADH + H^{+} ⇌ retinol + NAD^{+}
retinol + NAD^{+} ⇌ retinal + NADH + H^{+}

Retinal (also known as retinaldehyde) can be irreversibly converted to all-trans-retinoic acid by the action of retinal dehydrogenase

retinal + NAD^{+} + H_{2}O → retinoic acid + NADH + H^{+}

Retinoic acid is actively transported into the cell nucleus by CRABp2 where it regulates thousands of genes by binding directly to gene targets via retinoic acid receptors.

In addition to retinol, retinal and retinoic acid, there are plant-, fungi- or bacteria-sourced carotenoids which can be metabolized to retinol, and are thus vitamin A vitamers.

There are also what are referred to as 2nd, 3rd and 4th generation retinoids which are not considered vitamin A vitamers because they cannot be converted to retinol, retinal or all-trans-retinoic acid. Some are prescription drugs, oral or topical, for various indications. Examples are etretinate, acitretin, adapalene, bexarotene, tazarotene and trifarotene.

== Absorption, metabolism and excretion ==
Retinyl esters from animal-sourced foods (or synthesized for dietary supplements for humans and domesticated animals) are acted upon by retinyl ester hydrolases in the lumen of the small intestine to release free retinol. Retinol enters enterocytes by passive diffusion. Absorption efficiency is in the range of 70 to 90%. Humans are at risk for acute or chronic vitamin A toxicity because there are no mechanisms to suppress absorption or excrete the excess in urine. Within the cell, retinol is there bound to retinol binding protein 2 (RBP2). It is then enzymatically re-esterified by the action of lecithin retinol acyltransferase and incorporated into chylomicrons that are secreted into the lymphatic system.

Unlike retinol, β-carotene is taken up by enterocytes by the membrane transporter protein scavenger receptor B1 (SCARB1). The protein is upregulated in times of vitamin A deficiency. If vitamin A status is in the normal range, SCARB1 is downregulated, reducing absorption. Also downregulated is the enzyme beta-carotene 15,15'-dioxygenase (formerly known as beta-carotene 15,15'-monooxygenase) coded for by the BCO1 gene (formerly BCMO1), responsible for symmetrically cleaving β-carotene into retinal. Absorbed β-carotene is either incorporated as such into chylomicrons or first converted to retinal and then retinol, bound to RBP2. After a meal, roughly two-thirds of the chylomicrons are taken up by the liver with the remainder delivered to peripheral tissues. Peripheral tissues also can convert chylomicron β-carotene to retinol.

The capacity to store retinol in the liver means that well-nourished humans can go months on a vitamin A deficient diet without manifesting signs and symptoms of deficiency. Two liver cell types are responsible for storage and release: hepatocytes and hepatic stellate cells (HSCs). Hepatocytes take up the lipid-rich chylomicrons, bind retinol to retinol-binding protein 4 (RBP4), and transfer the retinol-RBP4 to HSCs for storage in lipid droplets as retinyl esters. Mobilization reverses the process: retinyl ester hydrolase releases free retinol which is transferred to hepatocytes, bound to RBP4, and put into blood circulation. Other than either after a meal or when consumption of large amounts exceeds liver storage capacity, more than 95% of retinol in circulation is bound to RBP4.

=== Carnivores ===
Strict carnivores manage vitamin A differently than omnivores and herbivores. Carnivores are more tolerant of high intakes of retinol because those species have the ability to excrete retinol and retinyl esters in urine. Carnivores also have the ability to store more in the liver, due to a higher ratio of liver HSCs to hepatocytes compared to omnivores and herbivores. For humans, liver content can range from 20 to 30 μg/gram wet weight. Notoriously, polar bear liver is acutely toxic to humans because content has been reported in range of 2,215 to 10,400 μg/g wet weight. As noted, in humans, retinol circulates bound to RBP4. Carnivores maintain R-RBP4 within a tight range while also having retinyl esters in circulation. Bound retinol is delivered to cells while the esters are excreted in the urine. In general, carnivore species are poor converters of ionone-containing carotenoids, and pure carnivores such as felidae (cats) lack the cleaving enzyme entirely. They must have retinol or retinyl esters in their diet.

=== Herbivores ===
Herbivores consume ionone-containing carotenoids and convert those to retinal. Some species, including cattle and horses, have measurable amounts of β-carotene circulating in the blood, and stored in body fat, creating yellow fat cells. Most species have white fat and no β-carotene in circulation.

=== Activation and excretion ===
In the liver and peripheral tissues of humans, retinol is reversibly converted to retinal by the action of alcohol dehydrogenases, which are also responsible for the conversion of ethanol to acetaldehyde. Retinal is irreversibly oxidized to retinoic acid (RA) by the action of aldehyde dehydrogenases. RA regulates the activation or deactivation of genes. The oxidative degradation of RA is induced by RA – its presence triggers its removal, making for a short-acting gene transcription signal. This deactivation is mediated by a cytochrome P450 (CYP) enzyme system, specifically enzymes CYP26A1, CYP26B1 and CYP26C1. CYP26A1 is the predominant form in the human liver; all other human adult tissues contained higher levels of CYP26B1. CYP26C1 is expressed mainly during embryonic development. All three convert retinoic acid into 4-oxo-RA, 4-OH-RA and 18-OH-RA. Glucuronic acid forms water-soluble glucuronide conjugates with the oxidized metabolites, which are then excreted in urine and feces.

== Metabolic functions ==
Other than for vision, the metabolic functions of vitamin A are mediated by all-trans-retinoic acid (RA). The formation of RA from retinal is irreversible. To prevent accumulation of RA it is oxidized and eliminated fairly quickly, i.e., has a short half-life. Three cytochromes catalyze the oxidation of retinoic acid. The genes for Cyp26A1, Cyp26B1 and Cyp26C1 are induced by high levels of RA, providing a self-regulating feedback loop.

=== Vision and eye health ===
Vitamin A status involves eye health via two separate functions. Retinal is an essential factor in rod cells and cone cells in the retina responding to light exposure by sending nerve signals to the brain. An early sign of vitamin A deficiency is night blindness. Vitamin A in the form of retinoic acid is essential to normal epithelial cell functions. Severe vitamin A deficiency, common in infants and young children in southeast Asia causes xerophthalmia characterized by dryness of the conjunctival epithelium and cornea. Untreated, xerophthalmia progresses to corneal ulceration and blindness.

==== Vision ====
The role of vitamin A in the visual cycle is specifically related to the retinal compound. Retinol is converted by the enzyme RPE65 within the retinal pigment epithelium into 11-cis-retinal. Within the eye, 11-cis-retinal is bound to the protein opsin to form rhodopsin in rod cells and iodopsin in cone cells. As light enters the eye, the 11-cis-retinal is isomerized to the all-trans form. The all-trans-retinal dissociates from the opsin in a series of steps called photo-bleaching. This isomerization induces a nervous signal along the optic nerve to the visual center of the brain. After separating from opsin, the all-trans-retinal is recycled and converted back to the 11-cis-retinal form by a series of enzymatic reactions, which then completes the cycle by binding to opsin to reform rhodopsin in the retina. In addition, some of the all-trans-retinal may be converted to all-trans-retinol form and then transported with an interphotoreceptor retinol-binding protein to the retinal pigmented epithelial cells. Further esterification into all-trans-retinyl esters allow for storage of all-trans-retinol within the pigment epithelial cells to be reused when needed. It is for this reason that a deficiency in vitamin A will inhibit the reformation of rhodopsin, and will lead to one of the first symptoms, night blindness.

==== Night blindness ====
Vitamin A deficiency-caused night blindness is a reversible difficulty for the eyes to adjust to dim light. It is common in young children who have a diet inadequate in retinol and β-carotene. A process called dark adaptation typically causes an increase in photopigment amounts in response to low levels of illumination. This increases light sensitivity by up to 100,000 times compared to normal daylight conditions. Significant improvement in night vision takes place within ten minutes, but the process can take up to two hours to reach maximal effect. People expecting to work in a dark environment wore red-tinted goggles or were in a red light environment to not reverse the adaptation because red light does not deplete rhodopsin versus what occurs with yellow or green light.

==== Xerophthalmia and childhood blindness ====
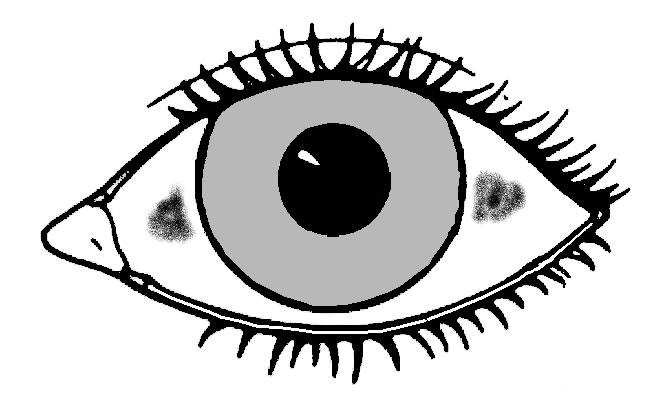
Typical location of Bitot's spots

Xerophthalmia, caused by a severe vitamin A deficiency, is described by pathologic dryness of the conjunctival epithelium and cornea. The conjunctiva becomes dry, thick, and wrinkled. Indicative is the appearance of Bitot's spots, which are clumps of keratin debris that build up inside the conjunctiva. If untreated, xerophthalmia can lead to dry eye syndrome, corneal ulceration and ultimately to blindness as a result of cornea and retina damage. Although xerophthalmia is an eye-related issue, prevention (and reversal) are functions of retinoic acid having been synthesized from retinal rather than the 11-cis-retinal to rhodopsin cycle.

Throughout southeast Asia, estimates are that more than half of children under the age of six years have subclinical vitamin A deficiency and night blindness, with progression to xerophthalmia being the leading cause of preventable childhood blindness. Estimates are that each year there are 350,000 cases of childhood blindness due to vitamin A deficiency. The causes are vitamin A deficiency during pregnancy, followed by low transfer of vitamin A during lactation and infant/child diets low in vitamin A or β-carotene. The prevalence of pre-school age children who are blind due to vitamin A deficiency is lower than expected from incidence of new cases only because childhood vitamin A deficiency significantly increases all-cause mortality.

According to a 2017 Cochrane review, vitamin A deficiency, using serum retinol less than 0.70 μmol/L as a criterion, is a major public health problem affecting an estimated 190 million children under five years of age in low- and middle-income countries, primarily in Sub-Saharan Africa and Southeast Asia. In lieu of or in combination with food fortification programs, many countries have implemented public health programs in which children are periodically given very large oral doses of synthetic vitamin A, usually retinyl palmitate, as a means of preventing and treating vitamin A deficiency. Doses were 50,000 to 100,000 IU (International units) for children aged 6 to 11 months and 100,000 to 200,000 IU for children aged 12 months to five years, the latter typically every four to six months. In addition to a 24% reduction in all-cause mortality, eye-related results were reported. Prevalence of Bitot's spots at follow-up were reduced by 58%, night blindness by 68%, xerophthalmia by 69%.

=== Gene regulation ===
RA regulates gene transcription by binding to nuclear receptors known as retinoic acid receptors (RARs; RARα, RARβ, RARγ) which are bound to DNA as heterodimers with retinoid "X" receptors (RXRs; RXRα, RXRβ, RXRγ). RARs and RXRs must dimerize before they can bind to the DNA. Expression of more than 500 genes is responsive to retinoic acid. RAR-RXR heterodimers recognize retinoic acid response elements on DNA. Upon binding retinoic acid, the receptors undergo a conformational change that causes co-repressors to dissociate from the receptors. Coactivators can then bind to the receptor complex, which may help to loosen the chromatin structure from the histones or may interact with the transcriptional machinery. This response upregulates or downregulates the expression of target genes, including the genes that encode for the receptors themselves. To deactivate retinoic acid receptor signaling, three cytochromes (Cyp26A1, Cyp26B1 Cyp26C1) catalyze the oxidation of RA. The genes for these proteins are induced by high concentrations of RA, thus providing a regulatory feedback mechanism.

=== Embryology ===
In vertebrates and invertebrate chordates, RA has a pivotal role during development. Altering levels of endogenous RA signaling during early embryology, either too low or too high, leads to birth defects, including congenital vascular and cardiovascular defects. Of note, fetal alcohol spectrum disorder encompasses congenital anomalies, including craniofacial, auditory, and ocular defects, neurobehavioral anomalies and mental disabilities caused by maternal consumption of alcohol during pregnancy. It is proposed that in the embryo there is competition between acetaldehyde, an ethanol metabolite, and retinaldehyde (retinal) for aldehyde dehydrogenase activity, resulting in a retinoic acid deficiency, and attributing the congenital birth defects to the loss of RA activated gene activation. In support of this theory, ethanol-induced developmental defects can be ameliorated by increasing the levels of retinol or retinal. As for the risks of too much RA during embryogenesis, the prescription drugs tretinoin (all-trans-retinoic acid) and isotretinoin (13-cis-retinoic acid), used orally or topically for acne treatment, are labeled with boxed warnings for pregnant women or women who may become pregnant, as they are known human teratogens.

=== Immune functions ===
Vitamin A deficiency has been linked to compromised resistance to infectious diseases. In countries where early childhood vitamin A deficiency is common, vitamin A supplementation public health programs initiated in the 1980s were shown to reduce the incidence of diarrhea and measles, and all-cause mortality. Vitamin A deficiency also increases the risk of immune system over-reaction, leading to chronic inflammation in the intestinal system, stronger allergic reactions and autoimmune diseases.

Lymphocytes and monocytes are types of white blood cells of the immune system. Lymphocytes include natural killer cells, which function in innate immunity, T cells for adaptive cellular immunity and B cells for antibody-driven adaptive humoral immunity. Monocytes differentiate into macrophages and dendritic cells. Some lymphocytes migrate to the thymus where they differentiate into several types of T cells, in some instances referred to as "killer" or "helper" T cells and further differentiate after leaving the thymus. Each subtype has functions driven by the types of cytokines secreted and organs to which the cells preferentially migrate, also described as trafficking or homing.

Retinoic acid (RA) triggers receptors in bone marrow, resulting in generation of new white blood cells. RA regulates proliferation and differentiation of white blood cells, the directed movement of T cells to the intestinal system, and to the up- and down-regulation of lymphocyte function. If RA is adequate, T helper cell subtype Th1 is suppressed and subtypes Th2, Th17 and iTreg (for regulatory) are induced. Dendritic cells located in intestinal tissue have enzymes that convert retinal to all-trans-retinoic acid, to be taken up by retinoic acid receptors on lymphocytes. The process triggers gene expression that leads to T cell types Th2, Th17 and iTreg moving to and taking up residence in mesenteric lymph nodes and Peyer's patches, respectively outside and on the inner wall of the small intestine. The net effect is a down-regulation of immune activity, seen as tolerance of food allergens, and tolerance of resident bacteria and other organisms in the microbiome of the large intestine. In a vitamin A deficient state, innate immunity is compromised and pro-inflammatory Th1 cells predominate.

==== Measles prevention ====
"Vitamin A deficiency (VAD) is a major public health problem in low- and middle-income countries, affecting 190 million children under five years of age and leading to many adverse health consequences, including death." Vitamin A deficiency is rare in the United States. A meta-analysis of clinical trials conducted in countries where VAD is prevalent concluded that when children were supplemented with vitamin A, there was a 50% reduction in incidence of contracting measles. Vitamin A supplementation is not thought to reduce the risk of death from measles. Young children given high doses of vitamin A from supplements or cod liver oil can accumulate to toxic levels and this can lead to hypervitaminosis A and liver damage. In the 2025 Southwest United States measles outbreak, centered in West Texas, some families continued to refuse vaccines and instead opted for giving vitamin A supplements or vitamins A- and D-containing cod liver oil to their children after Robert F. Kennedy Jr., promoted vitamin A as prevention and treatment. Multiple children hospitalized for measles at Covenant Children's Hospital in Lubbock also showed signs of liver damage, a symptom of vitamin A toxicity.

=== Skin ===
Deficiencies in vitamin A have been linked to an increased susceptibility to skin infection and inflammation. Vitamin A appears to modulate the innate immune response and maintains homeostasis of epithelial tissues and mucosa through its metabolite, retinoic acid (RA). As part of the innate immune system, toll-like receptors in skin cells respond to pathogens and cell damage by inducing a pro-inflammatory immune response which includes increased RA production. The epithelium of the skin encounters bacteria, fungi and viruses. Keratinocytes of the epidermal layer of the skin produce and secrete antimicrobial peptides (AMPs). Production of AMPs resistin and cathelicidin, are promoted by RA.

== Units of measurement ==
As some carotenoids can be converted into vitamin A, attempts have been made to determine how much of them in the diet is equivalent to a particular amount of retinol, so that comparisons can be made of the benefit of different foods. The situation can be confusing because the accepted equivalences have changed over time.

For many years, a system of equivalencies in which an international unit (IU) was equal to 0.3 μg of retinol (~1 nmol), 0.6 μg of β-carotene, or 1.2 μg of other provitamin-A carotenoids was used. This relationship was alternatively expressed by the retinol equivalent (RE): one RE corresponded to 1 μg retinol, to 2 μg β-carotene dissolved in oil, to 6 μg β-carotene in foods, and to 12 μg of either α-carotene, γ-carotene, or β-cryptoxanthin in food.

Newer research has shown that the absorption of provitamin-A carotenoids is only half as much as previously thought. As a result, in 2001 the US Institute of Medicine recommended a new unit, the retinol activity equivalent (RAE). Each μg RAE corresponds to 1 μg retinol, 2 μg of β-carotene in oil, 12 μg of "dietary" β-carotene, or 24 μg of the three other dietary provitamin-A carotenoids.

Substance and its chemical environment (per 1 μg)	IU (1989)	μg RE (1989)	μg RAE (2001)
Retinol	3.33	1	1
β-Carotene, dissolved in oil	1.67	1/2	1/2
β-Carotene, common dietary	1.67	1/6	1/12
α-Carotene, common dietary; γ-Carotene, common dietary; beta-Cryptoxanthin, common dietary	0.83	1/12	1/24

Animal models have shown that at the enterocyte cell wall, β-carotene is taken up by the membrane transporter protein scavenger receptor class B, type 1 (SCARB1). Absorbed β-carotene is converted to retinal and then retinol. The first step of the conversion process consists of one molecule of β-carotene cleaved by the enzyme β-carotene-15, 15'-monooxygenase, which in humans and other mammalian species is encoded by the BCM01 gene, into two molecules of retinal. When plasma retinol is in the normal range, gene expression for SCARB1 and BC01 are suppressed, creating a feedback loop that suppresses β-carotene absorption and conversion. Absorption suppression is not complete, as receptor 36 is not downregulated.

== Dietary recommendations ==
The US National Academy of Medicine updated Dietary Reference Intakes (DRIs) in 2001 for vitamin A, which included Recommended Dietary Allowances (RDAs). The tolerable upper intake level (UL) is 3000 μg/day. For children ages 1-3 years the vitamin A RDA and UL are 300 and 600 μg/day, respectively, for children ages 4-8 years 400 and 900 μg/day. People consuming cod liver oil as a source of omega-3 fatty acids should pay attention to how much vitamin A and vitamin D this adds to their diet.

For infants up to 12 months, there was not sufficient information to establish an RDA, so Adequate Intake (AI) is shown instead. As for safety, tolerable upper intake levels (ULs) were also established. For ULs, carotenoids are not added when calculating total vitamin A intake for safety assessments.

Life stage group		US RDAs or AIs (μg RAE/day)	US Upper limits (μg/day)
Infants	0–6 months	400 (AI)	600
Infants	7–12 months	500 (AI)	600
Children	1–3 years	300	600
Children	4–8 years	400	900
Males	9–13 years	600	1700
Males	14–18 years	900	2800
Males	>19 years	900	3000
Females	9–13 years	600	1700
Females	14–18 years	700	2800
Females	>19 years	700	3000
Pregnancy	<19 years	750	2800
Pregnancy	>19 years	770	3000
Lactation	<19 years	1200	2800
Lactation	>19 years	1300	3000

The European Food Safety Authority (EFSA) refers to the collective set of information as Dietary Reference Values, with Population Reference Intake (PRI) instead of RDA, and Average Requirement instead of EAR. AI and UL are defined the same as in the United States. For women and men of ages 15 and older, the PRIs are set respectively at 650 and 750 μg RE/day. PRI for pregnancy is 700 μg RE/day, for lactation 1300/day. For children of ages 1–14 years, the PRIs increase with age from 250 to 600 μg RE/day. These PRIs are similar to the US RDAs. The EFSA reviewed the same safety question as the United States, and set ULs at 800 for ages 1–3, 1100 for ages 4–6, 1500 for ages 7–10, 2000 for ages 11–14, 2600 for ages 15–17 and 3000 μg/day for ages 18 and older for preformed vitamin A, i.e., not including dietary contributions from carotenoids.

=== Safety ===
Vitamin A toxicity (hypervitaminosis A) occurs when too much vitamin A accumulates in the body. It comes from consumption of preformed vitamin A but not of carotenoids, as conversion of the latter to retinol is suppressed by the presence of adequate retinol.

==== Retinol safety ====
There are historical reports of acute hypervitaminosis from Arctic explorers consuming bearded seal or polar bear liver, both very rich sources of stored retinol, and there are also case reports of acute hypervitaminosis from consuming fish liver, but otherwise there is no risk from consuming too much via commonly consumed foods. Only consumption of retinol-containing dietary supplements can result in acute or chronic toxicity. Acute toxicity occurs after a single or short-term doses of greater than 150,000 μg. Symptoms include blurred vision, nausea, vomiting, dizziness and headache within 8 to 24 hours. For infants ages 0–6 months given an oral dose to prevent development of vitamin A deficiency, bulging skull fontanel was evident after 24 hours, usually resolved by 72 hours. Chronic toxicity may occur with long-term consumption of vitamin A at doses of 25,000–33,000 IU/day for several months. Excessive consumption of alcohol can lead to chronic toxicity at lower intakes. Symptoms may include nervous system effects, liver abnormalities, fatigue, muscle weakness, bone and skin changes and others. The adverse effects of both acute and chronic toxicity are reversed after consumption is stopped.

In 2001, for the purpose of determining ULs for adults, the US Institute of Medicine considered three primary adverse effects and settled on two: teratogenicity, i.e., causing birth defects, and liver abnormalities. Reduced bone mineral density was considered, but dismissed because the human evidence was contradictory. During pregnancy, especially during the first trimester, consumption of retinol in amounts exceeding 4,500 μg/day increased the risk of birth defects, but not below that amount, thus setting a "No-Observed Adverse-Effect Level" (NOAEL). Given the quality of the clinical trial evidence, the NOAEL was divided by an uncertainty factor of 1.5 to set the UL for women of reproductive age at 3,000 μg/day of preformed vitamin A. For all other adults, liver abnormalities were detected at intakes above 14,000 μg/day. Given the weak quality of the clinical evidence, an uncertainty factor of 5 was used, and with rounding, the UL was set at 3,000 μg/day.

For children, ULs were extrapolated from the adult value, adjusted for relative body weight. For infants, several case studies reported adverse effects that include bulging fontanels, increased intracranial pressure, loss of appetite, hyperirritability and skin peeling after chronic ingestion of the order of 6,000 or more μg/day. Given the small database, an uncertainty factor of 10 divided into the "Lowest-Observed-Adverse-Effect Level" (LOAEL) led to a UL of 600 μg/day.

==== beta-carotene safety ====
No adverse effects other than carotenemia have been reported for consumption of β-carotene rich foods. Supplementation with β-carotene does not cause hypervitaminosis A. Two large clinical trials (ATBC and CARET) were conducted in tobacco smokers to see if years of β-carotene supplementation at 20 or 30 mg/day in oil-filled capsules would reduce the risk of lung cancer. These trials were implemented because observational studies had reported a lower incidence of lung cancer in tobacco smokers who had diets higher in β-carotene. Unexpectedly, high-dose β-carotene or retinol supplementation resulted in a higher incidence of lung cancer and of total mortality due to cardiac mortality. Taking this and other evidence into consideration, the U.S. Institute of Medicine decided not to set a Tolerable Upper Intake Level (UL) for β-carotene. The European Food Safety Authority, acting for the European Union, also decided not to set a UL for β-carotene.

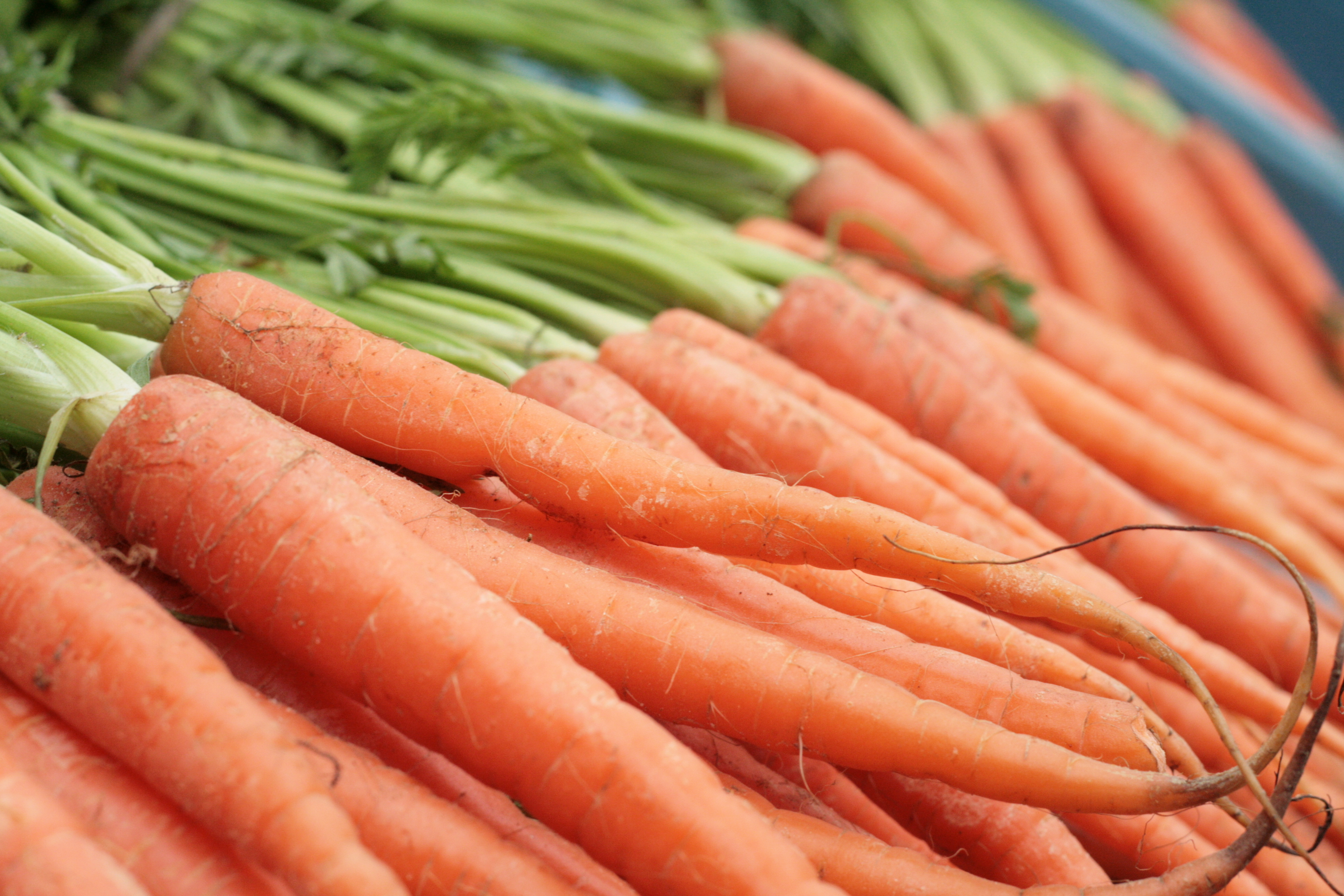
Carrots are a rich source of β-carotene.

==== Carotenosis ====
Carotenoderma, also referred to as carotenemia, is a benign and reversible medical condition where an excess of dietary carotenoids results in orange discoloration of the outermost skin layer. It is associated with a high blood β-carotene value. This can occur after a month or two of consumption of β-carotene rich foods, such as carrots, carrot juice, tangerine juice, mangos, or in Africa, red palm oil. β-carotene dietary supplements can have the same effect. The discoloration extends to palms and soles of feet, but not to the white of the eye, which helps distinguish the condition from jaundice. Consumption of greater than 30 mg/day for a prolonged period has been confirmed as leading to carotenemia.

=== U.S. Labeling ===
For U.S. food and dietary supplement labeling purposes, the amount in a serving is expressed as a percent of Daily Value (%DV). For vitamin A labeling purposes, 100% of the Daily Value was set at 5,000 IU, but it was revised to 900 μg RAE on 27 May 2016. A table of the old and new adult daily values is provided at Reference Daily Intake.

== Sources ==
Food	μg RAE (2001) per 100 g
cod liver oil	30,000
beef liver (cooked)	4,970–21,145
chicken liver (cooked)	4,296
Sweet potato, baked, no added fat	957
Carrot, frozen, cooked, no added fat	843
Pumpkin, canned, cooked	767
butter (stick)	684
Spinach, fresh, cooked, no added fat	341
cheddar cheese	316
Kale, fresh, cooked, no added fat	245
egg (cooked)	140

Vitamin A is found in many foods. Vitamin A in food exists either as preformed retinol – an active form of vitamin A – found in animal liver, dairy and egg products, and some fortified foods, or as provitamin A carotenoids, which are plant pigments digested into vitamin A after consuming carotenoid-rich plant foods, typically in red, orange, or yellow colors. Carotenoid pigments may be masked by chlorophylls in dark green leaf vegetables, such as spinach. The relatively low bioavailability of plant-food carotenoids results partly from binding to proteins – chopping, homogenizing or cooking disrupts the plant proteins, increasing provitamin A carotenoid bioavailability.

Vegetarian and vegan diets can provide sufficient vitamin A in the form of provitamin A carotenoids if the diet contains carrots, carrot juice, sweet potatoes, green leafy vegetables such as spinach and kale, and other carotenoid-rich foods. In the U.S., the average daily intake of β-carotene is in the range 2–7 mg.

Some manufactured foods and dietary supplements are sources of vitamin A or β-carotene.

=== Fortification ===
Some countries require or recommend fortification of foods. As of January 2022, 37 countries, mostly in Sub-Saharan Africa, require food fortification of cooking oil, rice, wheat flour or maize (corn) flour with vitamin A, usually as retinyl palmitate or retinyl acetate. Examples include Pakistan, oil, 11.7 mg/kg and Nigeria, oil, 6 mg/kg; wheat and maize flour, 2 mg/kg. An additional 12 countries, mostly in southeast Asia, have a voluntary fortification program. For example, the government of India recommends 7.95 mg/kg in oil and 0.626 mg/kg for wheat flour and rice. However, compliance in countries with voluntary fortification is lower than countries with mandatory fortification. No countries in Europe or North America fortify foods with vitamin A.

Other means of fortifying foods via genetic engineering have been explored. Research on rice began in 1982. The first field trials of golden rice cultivars were conducted in 2004. The result was "Golden rice", a variety of Oryza sativa rice produced through genetic engineering to biosynthesize β-carotene, a precursor of retinol, in the edible parts of rice. In May 2018, regulatory agencies in the United States, Canada, Australia and New Zealand had concluded that Golden Rice met food safety standards. In July 2021, the Philippines became the first country to officially issue the biosafety permit for commercially propagating Golden Rice. However, in April 2023, the Supreme Court of the Philippines issued a Writ of Kalikasan ordering the Department of Agriculture to stop the commercial distribution of genetically modified rice in the country.

=== Vitamin a supplementation (VAS) ===
Vitamin a supplementation coverage rate children ages 6-59 months

Delivery of oral high-dose supplements remains the principal strategy for minimizing deficiency. As of 2017, more than 80 countries worldwide are implementing universal VAS programs targeted to children 6–59 months of age through semi-annual national campaigns. Doses in these programs are one dose of 50,000 or 100,000 IU for children aged 6 to 11 months and 100,000 to 200,000 IU for children aged 12 months to five years, every four to six months.

== Deficiency ==
=== Primary causes ===
Vitamin A deficiency is common in developing countries, especially in Sub-Saharan Africa and Southeast Asia. Deficiency can occur at any age, but is most common in pre-school-age children and pregnant women, the latter due to a need to transfer retinol to the fetus. The causes are low intake of retinol-containing, animal-sourced foods and low intake of carotene-containing, plant-sourced foods. Vitamin A deficiency is estimated to affect approximately one third of children under the age of five around the world, possibly leading to the deaths of 670,000 children under five annually.

Between 250,000 and 500,000 children in developing countries become blind each year owing to vitamin A deficiency. Vitamin A deficiency is "the leading cause of preventable childhood blindness", according to UNICEF. It also increases the risk of death from common childhood conditions, such as diarrhea. UNICEF regards addressing vitamin A deficiency as critical to reducing child mortality, the fourth of the United Nations' Millennium Development Goals.

During diagnosis, night blindness and dry eyes are signs of vitamin A deficiency that can be recognized without requiring biochemical tests. Plasma retinol is used to confirm vitamin A status. A plasma concentration of about 2.0 μmol/L is normal; less than 0.70 μmol/L (equivalent to 20 μg/dL) indicates moderate vitamin A deficiency, and less than 0.35 μmol/L (10 μg/dL) indicates severe vitamin A deficiency. Breast milk retinol of less than 8 μg/gram milk fat is considered insufficient. One weakness of these measures is that they are not good indicators of liver vitamin A stores as retinyl esters in hepatic stellate cells. The amount of vitamin A leaving the liver, bound to retinol binding protein (RBP), is under tight control as long as there are sufficient liver reserves. Only when liver content of vitamin A drops below approximately 20 μg/gram will concentration in the blood decline.

=== Secondary causes ===
There are causes for deficiency other than low dietary intake of vitamin A as retinol or carotenes. Adequate dietary protein and caloric energy are needed for a normal rate of synthesis of RBP, without which, retinol cannot be mobilized to leave the liver. Systemic infections can cause transient decreases in RBP synthesis even if protein-calorie malnutrition is absent. Chronic alcohol consumption reduces liver vitamin A storage. Non-alcoholic fatty liver disease (NAFLD), characterized by the accumulation of fat in the liver, is the hepatic manifestation of metabolic syndrome. Liver damage from NAFLD reduces liver storage capacity for retinol and reduces the ability to mobilize liver stores to maintain normal circulating concentration. Vitamin A appears to be involved in the pathogenesis of anemia by diverse biological mechanisms, such as the enhancement of growth and differentiation of erythrocyte progenitor cells, potentiation of immunity to infection, and mobilization of iron stores from tissues.

== Animal requirements ==
All vertebrate and chordate species require vitamin A, either as dietary carotenoids or preformed retinol from consuming other animals. Deficiencies have been reported in laboratory-raised and pet dogs, cats, birds, reptiles and amphibians, also commercially raised chickens and turkeys. Herbivore species such as horses, cattle and sheep can get sufficient β-carotene from green pasture to be healthy, but the content in pasture grass dry due to drought and long-stored hay can be too low, leading to vitamin A deficiency. Omnivore and carnivore species, especially those toward the top of the food chain, can accrue large amounts of retinyl esters in their livers, or else excrete retinyl esters in urine as a means of dealing with surplus. Before the era of synthetic retinol, cod liver oil, high in vitamins A and D, was a commonly consumed dietary supplement. Invertebrates cannot synthesize carotenoids or retinol, and thus must accrue these essential nutrients from consumption of algae, plants or animals.

== Medical uses ==
In 2022, vitamin A was the 346th most commonly prescribed medication in the United States, with more than 50,000 prescriptions.

=== Preventing and treating vitamin a deficiency ===
Recognition of its prevalence and consequences has led to governments and non-government organizations promoting vitamin A fortification of foods and creating programs that administer large bolus-size oral doses of vitamin A to young children every four to six months. In 2008, the World Health Organization estimated that vitamin A supplementation over a decade in 40 countries averted 1.25 million deaths due to vitamin A deficiency. A Cochrane review reported that vitamin A supplementation is associated with a clinically meaningful reduction in morbidity and mortality in children ages six month to five years of age. All-cause mortality was reduced by 14%, and incidence of diarrhea by 12%. However, a Cochrane review by the same group concluded there was insufficient evidence to recommend blanket vitamin A supplementation for infants one to six months of age, as it did not reduce infant mortality or morbidity.

=== Acne ===
==== Topical retinoic acid and retinol ====
Retinoids: Tretinoin is all-trans-retinoic acid; initial tradename: Retin-A. Isotretinoin is 13-cis-retinoic acid; initial tradename: Accutane. Etretinate and Acitretin, its non-esterified metabolite, are used orally to treat severe psoriasis.

Retinoic acids tretinoin (all-trans-retinoic acid) and isotretinoin (13-cis-retinoic acid) are prescription medications used to treat moderate to severe cystic acne and acne not responsive to other treatments. Tretinoin is usually applied as a skin cream to the face after cleansing to remove make-up and skin oils, while isotretinoin is taken orally. Tretinoin and isotretinoin act by binding to two nuclear receptor families within keratinocytes: the retinoic acid receptors (RAR) and the retinoid X receptors (RXR). These events contribute to the normalization of follicular keratinization and decreased cohesiveness of keratinocytes, resulting in reduced follicular occlusion and microcomedone formation. The retinoid-receptor complex competes for coactivator proteins of AP-1, a key transcription factor involved in inflammation. Retinoic acid products also reduce sebum secretion, a nutrient source for bacteria, from facial pores.

These drugs, when applied topically, are US-designated Pregnancy Category C (animal reproduction studies have shown an adverse effect on the fetus), and should not be used by pregnant women or women who are anticipating becoming pregnant. Many countries established a physician- and patient- education pregnancy prevention policy.

Trifarotene is a prescription retinoid for the topical treatment acne vulgaris. It functions as a retinoic acid receptor (RAR)-γ agonist.

Non-prescription topical products that have health claims for reducing facial acne, combating skin dark spots and reducing wrinkles and lines associated with aging often contain retinyl palmitate. The hypothesis is that this is absorbed and de-esterified to free retinol, then converted to retinaldehyde and further metabolized to all-trans-retinoic acid, whence it will have the same effects as prescription products with fewer side effects. There is some ex vivo evidence with human skin that esterified retinol is absorbed and then converted to retinol. In addition to esterified retinol, some of these products contain hydroxypinacolone retinoate, identified as esterified 9-cis-retinoic acid.

==== Oral isotretinoin ====
Oral isotretinoin (retinoic acid isomer) is recommended for treating treatment resistant acne, acne that can lead to scarring, and acne that is associated with psychosocial distress. It is approved by the FDA for treating severe acne vulgaris that is resistant to other treatment options. Isotretinoin is a known teratogen, with an estimated 20–35% risk of physical birth defects to infants that are exposed to isotretinoin in utero, including numerous congenital defects such as craniofacial defects, cardiovascular and neurological malformations or thymic disorders. Neurocognitive impairments in the absence of any physical defects has been established to be 30–60%. For these reasons, physician- and patient-education programs were initiated, recommending that for women of child-bearing age, contraception be initiated a month before starting oral (or topical) isotretinoin, and continue for a month after treatment ended. In the US, isotretinoin was released to the market in 1982 as a revolutionary treatment for severe and refractory acne vulgaris. It was shown that a dose of 0.5–1.0 mg/kg body weight/day is enough to produce a reduction in sebum excretion by 90% within a month or two, but the recommended treatment duration is 4 to 6 months.

The mechanism by which orally consumed retinoic acid (RA), as all-trans-tretinoin or 13-cis-isotretinoin improves facial skin health is thought to be by switching on genes and differentiating keratinocytes (immature skin cells) into mature epidermal cells. RA reduces the size and secretion of the sebaceous glands, and by doing so reduces bacterial numbers in both the ducts and skin surface. It reduces inflammation via inhibition of chemotactic responses of monocytes and neutrophils.

=== Other dermatological conditions ===
In addition to the approved use for treating acne vulgaris, researchers have investigated off-label applications for dermatological conditions, such as rosacea, psoriasis, and other conditions. Rosacea was reported as responding favorably to doses lower than used for acne. Isotretinoin in combination with ultraviolet light was shown affective for treating psoriasis. Isotretinoin in combination with injected interferon-alpha showed some potential for treating genital warts. Isotretinoin in combination with topical fluorouracil or injected interferon-alpha showed some potential for treating precancerous skin lesions and skin cancer.

=== Immune function ===
Vitamin A plays an important role in the body's immune function, both the adaptive response, and to help the body fight off infection. The anti-inflammatory effects of vitamin A also contribute to repairing mucosal cells that can be damaged by an infection. For these reasons, there have been quite a few studies looking at the potential role that Vitamin A supplementation may play in improving an immune response or to helping the body fight off an infection. The evidence supporting vitamin A supplementation for children under the age of 7 years to prevent upper respiratory tract infections is weak, and the weak evidence from low-quality clinical trials does not support vitamin A as being effective or having a benefit. More research is needed to consider different doses, the ages and populations of people who may potentially benefit, and the length of treatment.

== Synthesis ==
=== Biosynthesis ===
Carotenoid synthesis takes place in plants, certain fungi, and bacteria. Structurally carotenes are tetraterpenes, meaning that they are synthesized biochemically from four 10-carbon terpene units, which in turn were formed from eight 5-carbon isoprene units. Intermediate steps are the creation of a 40-carbon phytoene molecule, conversion to lycopene via desaturation, and then creation of ionone rings at both ends of the molecule. β-carotene has a β-ionone ring at both ends, meaning that the molecule can be divided symmetrically to yield two retinol molecules. α-Carotene has a β-ionone ring at one end and an Ɛ-ionone ring at the other, so it has half the retinol conversion capacity.

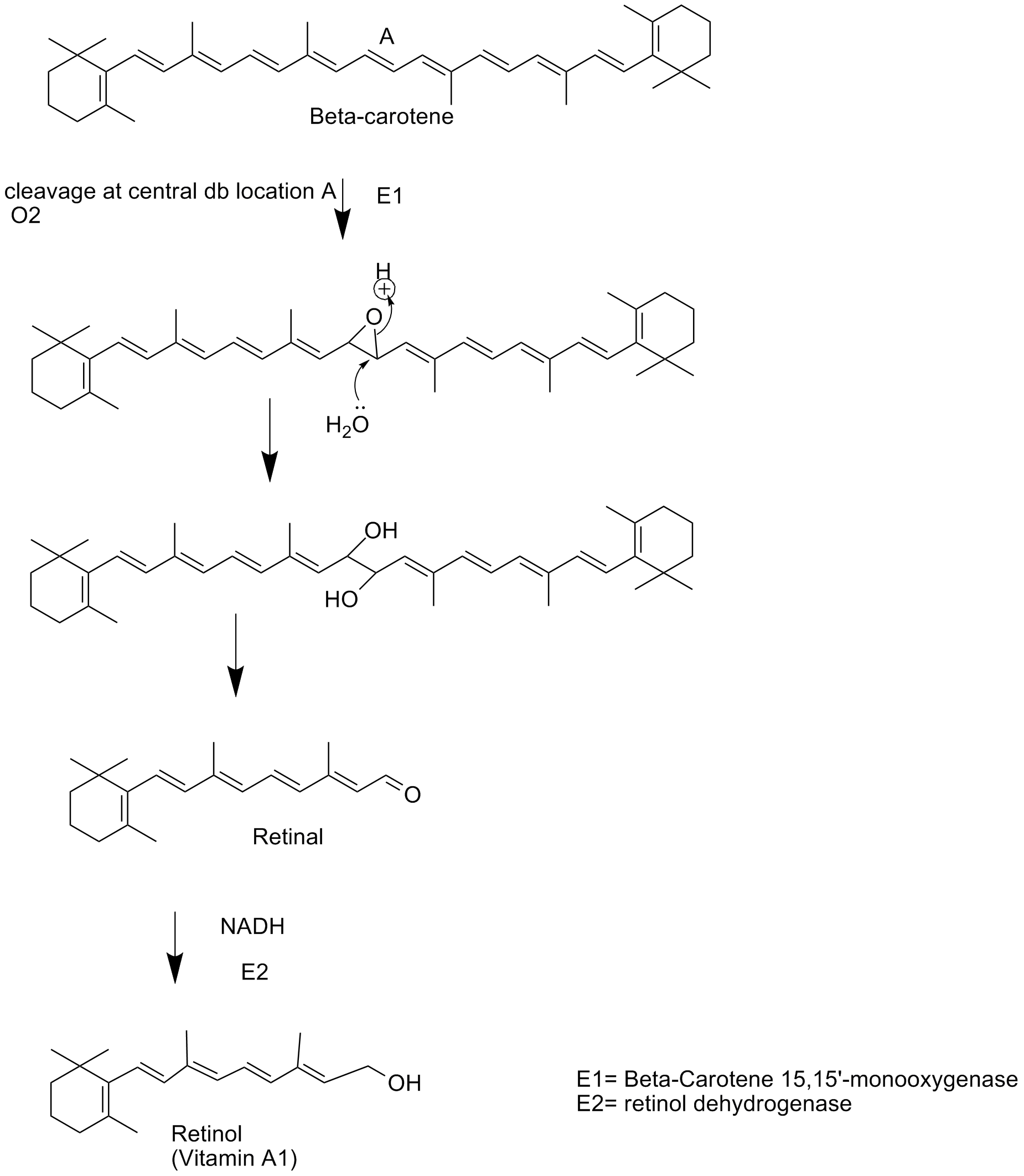
Vitamin A biosynthesis from β-carotene

In most animal species, retinol is synthesized from the breakdown of the plant-formed provitamin, β-carotene. First, the enzyme beta-carotene 15,15'-dioxygenase (BCO-1) cleaves β-carotene at the central double bond, creating an epoxide. This epoxide is then attacked by water creating two hydroxyl groups in the center of the structure. The cleavage occurs when these alcohols are oxidized to the aldehydes using NAD^{+}. The resultant retinal is then quickly reduced to retinol by the enzyme retinol dehydrogenase. Omnivore species such as dogs, wolves, coyotes and foxes in general are low producers of BCO-1. The enzyme is lacking in felids (cats), meaning that vitamin A requirements are met from the retinyl ester content of prey animals.

=== Industrial synthesis ===
β-ionone ring

β-carotene can be extracted from fungus Blakeslea trispora, marine algae Dunaliella salina or genetically modified yeast Saccharomyces cerevisiae, starting with xylose as a substrate. Chemical synthesis uses either a method developed by BASF or a Grignard reaction utilized by Hoffman-La Roche.

The world market for synthetic retinol is primarily for animal feed, leaving approximately 13% for a combination of food, prescription medication and dietary supplement use. Industrial methods for the production of retinol rely on chemical synthesis. The first industrialized synthesis of retinol was achieved by the company Hoffmann-La Roche in 1947. In the following decades, eight other companies developed their own processes. β-ionone, synthesized from acetone, is the essential starting point for all industrial syntheses. Each process involves elongating the unsaturated carbon chain. Pure retinol is extremely sensitive to oxidization and is prepared and transported at low temperatures and oxygen-free atmospheres. When prepared as a dietary supplement or food additive, retinol is stabilized as the ester derivatives retinyl acetate or retinyl palmitate. Prior to 1999, three companies, Roche, BASF and Rhone-Poulenc controlled 96% of global vitamin A sales. In 2001, the European Commission imposed total fines of 855.22 million euros on these and five other companies for their participation in eight distinct market-sharing and price-fixing cartels that dated back to 1989. Roche sold its vitamin division to DSM in 2003. DSM and BASF have the major share of industrial production. A biosynthesis alternative utilizes genetically engineered yeast species Saccharomyces cerevisiae to synthesize retinal and retinol, using xylose as a starting substrate. This was accomplished by having the yeast first synthesize β-carotene and then the cleaving enzyme β-carotene 15,15'-dioxygenase to yield retinal.

== Research ==
=== Brain ===
Animal research (on mice), which is pre-clinical, also found Retinoid acid, the bioactive metabolite of vitamin A, to have an effect on brain areas responsible for memory and learning.

=== Cancer ===
Meta-analyses of intervention and observational trials for various types of cancer report mixed results. Supplementation with β-carotene did not appear to decrease the risk of cancer overall, nor specific cancers including: pancreatic, colorectal, prostate, breast, melanoma, or skin cancer generally. High-dose β-carotene supplementation unexpectedly resulted in a higher incidence of lung cancer and of total mortality in people who were cigarette smokers.

For dietary retinol, no effects were observed for high dietary intake and breast cancer survival, risk of liver cancer, risk of bladder cancer or risk of colorectal cancer, although the last review did report lower risk for higher β-carotene consumption. In contrast, an inverse association was reported between retinol intake and relative risk of esophageal cancer, gastric cancer, ovarian cancer, pancreatic cancer, lung cancer, melanoma, and cervical cancer. For lung cancer, an inverse association was also seen for β-carotene intake, separate from the retinol results. When high dietary intake was compared to low dietary intake, the decreases in relative risk were in the range of 15 to 20%. For gastric cancer, a meta-analysis of prevention trials reported a 29% decrease in relative risk from retinol supplementation at 1500 μg/day

=== Fetal alcohol spectrum disorder ===
Fetal alcohol spectrum disorder (FASD), formerly referred to as fetal alcohol syndrome, presents as craniofacial malformations, neurobehavioral disorders and mental disabilities, all attributed to exposing human embryos to alcohol during fetal development. The risk of FASD depends on the amount consumed, the frequency of consumption, and the points in pregnancy at which the alcohol is consumed. Ethanol is a known teratogen, i.e., causes birth defects. Ethanol is metabolized by alcohol dehydrogenase enzymes into acetaldehyde. The subsequent oxidation of acetaldehyde into acetate is performed by aldehyde dehydrogenase enzymes. Given that retinoic acid (RA) regulates numerous embryonic and differentiation processes, one of the proposed mechanisms for the teratogenic effects of ethanol is a competition for the enzymes required for the biosynthesis of RA from vitamin A. Animal research demonstrates that in the embryo, the competition takes place between acetaldehyde and retinaldehyde for aldehyde dehydrogenase activity. In this model, acetaldehyde inhibits the production of retinoic acid by retinaldehyde dehydrogenase. Ethanol-induced developmental defects can be ameliorated by increasing the levels of retinol, retinaldehyde, or retinaldehyde dehydrogenase. Thus, animal research supports the reduction of retinoic acid activity as an etiological trigger in the induction of FASD.

=== Malaria ===
Malaria and vitamin A deficiency are both common among young children in sub-Saharan Africa. Vitamin A supplementation to children in regions where vitamin A deficiency is common has repeatedly been shown to reduce overall mortality rates, especially from measles and diarrhea. For malaria, clinical trial results are mixed, either showing that vitamin A treatment did not reduce the incidence of probable malarial fever, or else did not affect incidence, but did reduce slide-confirmed parasite density and reduced the number of fever episodes. The question was raised as to whether malaria causes vitamin A deficiency, or vitamin A deficiency contributes to the severity of malaria, or both. Researchers proposed several mechanisms by which malaria (and other infections) could contribute to vitamin A deficiency, including a fever-induced reduction in synthesis of retinal-binding protein (RBP) responsible for transporting retinol from liver to plasma and tissues, but reported finding no evidence for a transient depression or restoration of plasma RBP or retinol after a malarial infection was eliminated.

== History ==
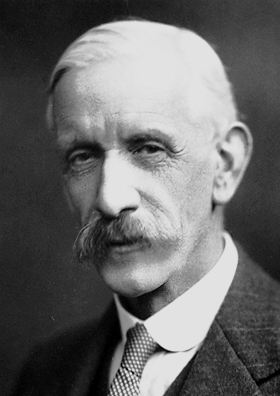
Frederick Gowland Hopkins, 1929 Nobel Prize for Physiology or Medicine

In 1912, Frederick Gowland Hopkins demonstrated that unknown accessory factors found in milk, other than carbohydrates, proteins, and fats were necessary for growth in rats. Hopkins received a Nobel Prize for this discovery in 1929. By 1913, one of these substances was independently discovered by Elmer McCollum and Marguerite Davis at the University of Wisconsin–Madison, and Lafayette Mendel and Thomas Burr Osborne at Yale University. McCollum and Davis ultimately received credit because they submitted their paper three weeks before Mendel and Osborne. Both papers appeared in the same issue of the Journal of Biological Chemistry in 1913. The "accessory factors" were termed "fat soluble" in 1918, and later "vitamin A" in 1920. In 1919, Harry Steenbock (University of Wisconsin–Madison) proposed a relationship between yellow plant pigments (β-carotene) and vitamin A. In 1931, Swiss chemist Paul Karrer described the chemical structure of vitamin A. Retinoic acid and retinol were first synthesized in 1946 and 1947 by two Dutch chemists, David Adriaan van Dorp and Jozef Ferdinand Arens.

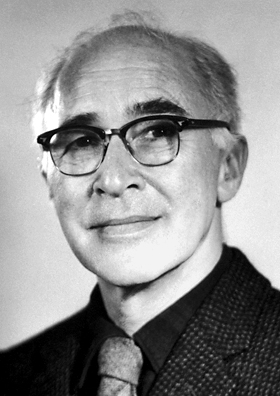
George Wald, 1967 Nobel Prize for Physiology or Medicine

During World War II, German bombers would attack at night to evade British defenses. In order to keep the 1939 invention of a new on-board Airborne Intercept Radar system secret from Germany, the British Ministry of Information told newspapers an unproven claim that the nighttime defensive success of Royal Air Force pilots was due to a high dietary intake of carrots rich in β-carotene, successfully convincing many people.

In 1967, George Wald shared the Nobel Prize in Physiology and Medicine for his work on chemical visual processes in the eye. Wald had demonstrated in 1935 that photoreceptor cells in the eye contain rhodopsin, a chromophore composed of the protein opsin and 11-cis-retinal. When struck by light, 11-cis-retinal undergoes photoisomerization to all-trans-retinal and via signal transduction cascade send a nerve signal to the brain. The all-trans-retinal is reduced to all-trans-retinol and travels back to the retinal pigment epithelium to be recycled to 11-cis-retinal and reconjugated to opsin. Wald's work was the culmination of nearly 60 years of research. In 1877, Franz Christian Boll identified a light-sensitive pigment in the outer segments of rod cells of the retina that faded/bleached when exposed to light, but was restored after light exposure ceased. He suggested that this substance, by a photochemical process, conveyed the impression of light to the brain. The research was taken up by Wilhelm Kühne, who named the pigment rhodopsin, also known as "visual purple." Kühne confirmed that rhodopsin is extremely sensitive to light, and thus enables vision in low-light conditions, and that it was this chemical decomposition that stimulated nerve impulses to the brain. Research stalled until after identification of "fat-soluble vitamin A" as a dietary substance found in milkfat but not lard, would reverse night blindness and xerophthalmia. In 1925, Fridericia and Holm demonstrated that vitamin A deficient rats were unable to regenerate rhodopsin after being moved from a light to a dark room.
