= CYP13 family =

Group of cytochrome P450 enzymes

Cytochrome P450, family 13, also known as CYP13, is a nematoda cytochrome P450 monooxygenase family. The first gene identified in this family is the CYP13A1 from the Caenorhabditis elegans.

CYP13 can be divided into subfamily CYP13A and CYP13B, and the CYP13B was named CYP16 family at the beginning of its discovery, which have been discontinued and been changed to the current name, because its genetic relationship with the subfamily CYP13A.

== Genes in C. elegans ==
Gene	Biological Functions	Protein Length	Ref
CYP13A1		519	
CYP13A2		515	
CYP13A3		520	
CYP13A4		520	
CYP13A5	Dauer formation	520	
CYP13A6		518	
CYP13A7	Dauer formation, Detoxication	518	
CYP13A8	Acidic Stress	509	
CYP13A9	pseudogene		
CYP13A10		519	
CYP13A11		517	
CYP13A12	Lipid metabolism	518	
CYP13B1		510	
CYP13B2		511	
