= Retinoic acid =

Metabolite of vitamin A

All-trans-retinoic acid
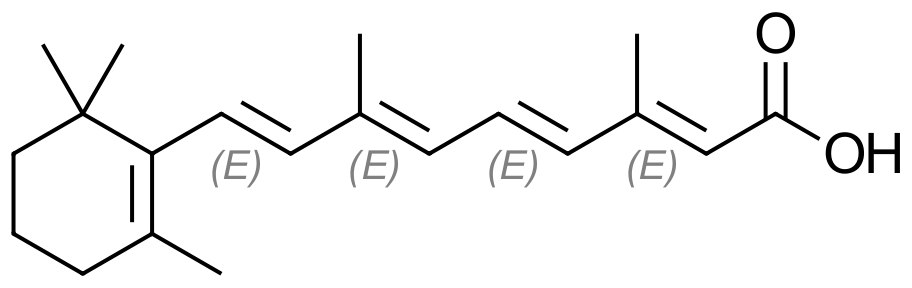

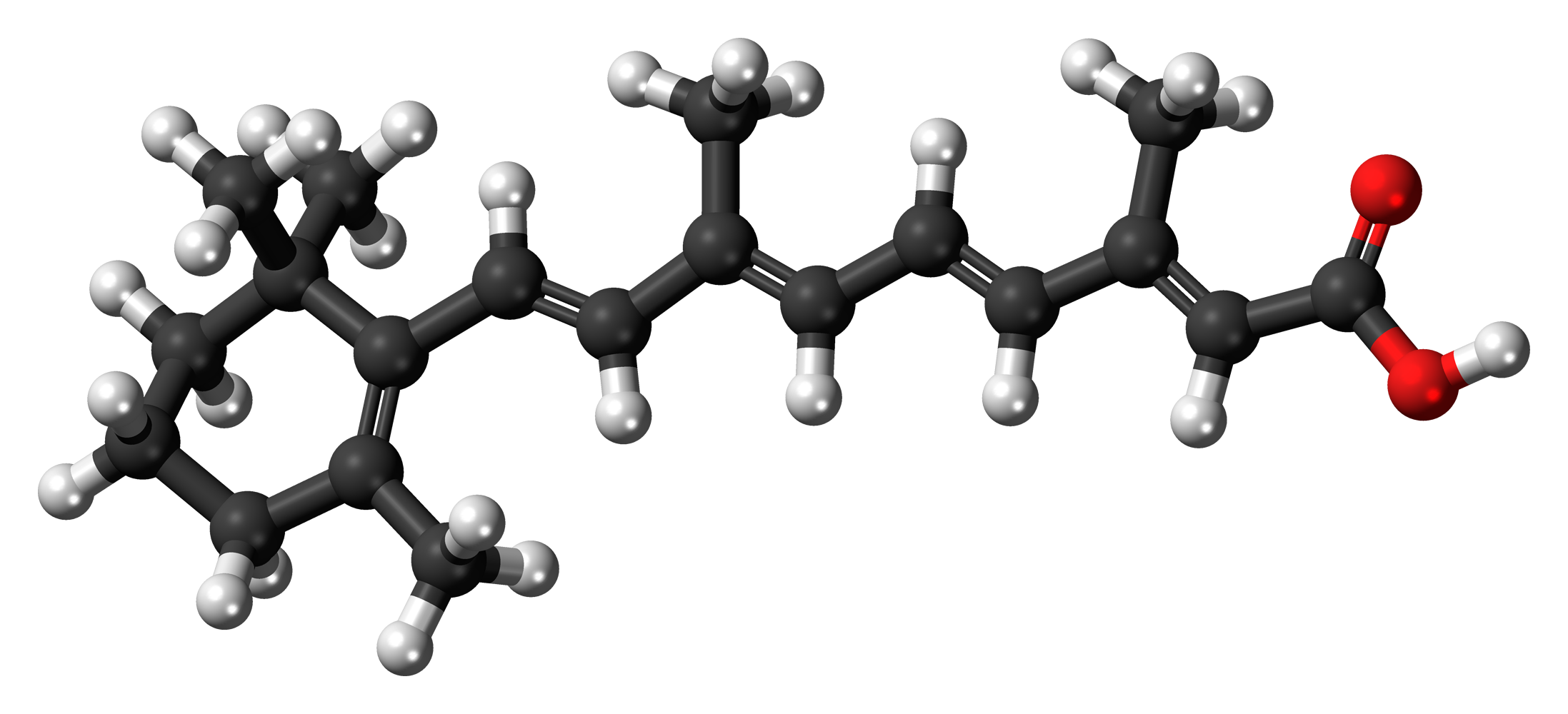

Names
- IUPAC name Retinoic acid
- Systematic IUPAC name (2E,4E,6E,8E)-3,7-Dimethyl-9-(2,6,6-trimethylcyclohex-1-en-1-yl)nona-2,4,6,8-tetraenoic acid
- Other names vitamin A acid; RA

Identifiers
CAS Number	302-79-4
3D model (JSmol)	Interactive image
ChEBI	CHEBI:15367
ChEMBL	ChEMBL38
ChemSpider	392618
IUPHAR/BPS	2644
PubChem CID	444795
UNII	5688UTC01R
- InChI: InChI=1S/C20H28O2/c1-15(8-6-9-16(2)14-19(21)22)11-12-18-17(3)10-7-13-20(18,4)5/h6,8-9,11-12,14H,7,10,13H2,1-5H3,(H,21,22)/b9-6+,12-11+,15-8+,16-14+ Key: SHGAZHPCJJPHSC-YCNIQYBTSA-N
- SMILES: CC1=C(C(CCC1)(C)C)/C=C/C(=C/C=C/C(=C/C(=O)O)/C)/C

Properties
Chemical formula	C_{20}H_{28}O_{2}
Molar mass	300.442 g·mol^{−1}
Appearance	Yellow to light orange crystalline powder with a characteristic of a floral scent
Melting point	180 to 182 °C (356 to 360 °F; 453 to 455 K) Crystals from ethanol
Solubility in water	Nearly insoluble
Solubility in fat	Soluble

Related compounds
Related compounds	retinol; retinal; beta-carotene
- Except where otherwise noted, data are given for materials in their standard state (at 25 °C [77 °F], 100 kPa). verify (what is ?) Infobox references

Retinoic acid is a metabolite of vitamin A_{1} (all-trans-retinol) that exists in several distinct isomeric forms, including all-trans retinoic acid, 9-cis retinoic acid and 13-cis retinoic acid. These isomers are responsible for diverse roles in biology, affecting development, male fertility, skin health and various diseases. The classic isomer, all-trans retinoic acid, is required for discrete phases of embryonic development and for the production of sperm in men. The 9-cis and 13-cis isomers are less well understood as regulators of biology, and are more often researched in their drug forms as Alitretinoin and Isotretinoin, respectively.

All-trans-retinoic acid (often simplified as Retinoic acid) activates the Retinoid Nuclear Receptor pathway, which is one of the 12 classic vitamin- or hormone-activated nuclear receptors. In healthy adults, clinical trials have shown that removal of all-trans-retinoic acid has a limited effect that is restricted to the initiation of spermatogenesis in men. Meanwhile, increasing the levels of all-trans-retinoic acid, such as through the use of Tretinoin, has biological effects that are not normally associated with the pathway.

All-trans-retinoic acid is the major occurring retinoic acid, while isomers like 13-cis- and 9-cis-retinoic acid are also present in much lower levels. Many diseases have been associated with elevated levels of all-trans-retinoic acid, such as Type 2 Diabetes.

The key role of all-trans-retinoic acid in embryonic development mediates the high teratogenicity of retinoid pharmaceuticals, such as isotretinoin (13-cis-retinoic acid) used for treatment of acne or retinol used for skin disorders. High oral doses of preformed vitamin A (retinyl palmitate), and all-trans-retinoic acid itself, also have teratogenic potential by this same mechanism.

== Mechanism of biological action ==
All-trans-retinoic acid acts by binding to the retinoic acid receptor (RAR), which is bound to DNA as a heterodimer with the retinoid X receptor (RXR) in regions called retinoic acid response elements (RAREs). Binding of the all-trans-retinoic acid ligand to RAR alters the conformation of the RAR, which affects the binding of other proteins that either induce or repress transcription of a nearby gene (including Hox genes and several other target genes). RARs mediate transcription of different sets of genes controlling differentiation of a variety of cell types, thus the target genes regulated depend upon the target cells. In some cells, one of the target genes is the gene for the retinoic acid receptor itself (RAR-beta in mammals), which amplifies the response. Control of retinoic acid levels is maintained by a suite of proteins that control synthesis and degradation of retinoic acid. The concentration of retinoic acid is tightly controlled and governs activation of the retinoid nuclear receptor pathway. In adults, retinoic acid is only detected at physiologically relevant levels in the testes, pancreas and immune tissues.

The molecular basis for the interaction between all-trans-retinoic acid and the Hox genes has been studied by using deletion analysis in transgenic mice carrying constructs of GFP reporter genes. Such studies have identified functional RAREs within flanking sequences of some of the most 3′ Hox genes (including HOXA1, HOXB1, HOXB4, HOXD4), suggesting a direct interaction between the genes and retinoic acid. These types of studies strongly support the normal roles of retinoids in patterning vertebrate embryogenesis through the Hox genes.

In mouse studies, all-trans-retinoic acid has a supplementary role in regulating the immune response. Retinoic acid produced by dendritic cells promotes regulatory T cell formation to promote tolerance within the colon. This pathway may also be used by cancer cells to suppress the immune system. In adult humans, all-trans-retinoic acid is necessary for the process of spermatogenesis. Experiments in healthy male subjects suggests that retinoic acid is only necessary for fertility in adult humans.

Retinoic acid plays a complex role in cancer. In some types of cancer cells that express retinoic acid receptors retinoic acid causes differentiation, while in other types of cancer cells that lack critical components of the retinoic acid signaling pathways retinoic acid may promote cancer progression by suppressing the immune response, and by promoting a dormant state in cancer cells whereby decreased proliferation and metabolism protects them from chemotherapy.

== Biosynthesis and metabolism ==
All-trans-retinoic acid can be produced in the body by two sequential oxidation steps that convert all-trans-retinol to retinaldehyde to all-trans-retinoic acid, but once produced it cannot be reduced again to all-trans-retinal. The enzymes that generate retinoic acid for regulation of gene expression include retinol dehydrogenase (Rdh10) that metabolizes retinol to retinaldehyde, and three types of retinaldehyde dehydrogenase (RALDH), i.e. ALDH1A1 (RALDH1), ALDH1A2 (RALDH2), and ALDH1A3 (RALDH3) that metabolize retinaldehyde to retinoic acid. Enzymes that metabolize retinoic acid to turn off biological signaling include the cytochrome P450 members (CYP26). Oxidized metabolites such as 4-oxoretinoic acid are eliminated by glucuronidation in the liver.

The 9-cis form was originally thought to be the endogenous ligand for retinoid X receptors, but later work failed to detect its natural production in animal tissue.

The 13-cis form is endogenously produced. All-trans-retinyl ester 13-cis isomerohydrolase makes 13-cis-retinol, which is then subject to the usual two-step oxidization process.

Although the human body produces 11-cis-retinol and 11-cis-retinal for the visual cycle, 11-cis retinoic acid is virtually unheard of.

== Function in embryonic development ==
All-trans-retinoic acid is a morphogen signaling molecule, which means it is concentration dependent; malformations can arise when the concentration of retinoic acid is in excess or deficient. Other signaling pathways that interact with the retinoic acid pathway are fibroblast growth factor 8, Cdx and Hox genes, all participating in the development of various structures within the embryo. For example, retinoic acid plays an important role in activating Hox genes required for hindbrain development. The hindbrain, which later differentiates into the brain stem, serves as a major signaling center defining the border of the head and trunk.

A double-sided retinoic acid gradient that is high in the trunk and low at the junction with the head and tail represses fibroblast growth factor 8 in the developing trunk to allow normal somitogenesis, forelimb bud initiation, and formation of the atria in the heart. During exposure to excess retinoic acid, the hindbrain becomes enlarged, hindering the growth of other parts of the brain; other developmental abnormalities that can occur during excess retinoic acid are missing or fused somites, and problems with the aorta and large vessels within the heart. With an accumulation of these malformations, an individual can be diagnosed with DiGeorge syndrome. However, since retinoic acid acts in various developmental processes, abnormalities associated with loss of retinoic acid are not only limited to sites associated with DiGeorge syndrome. Genetic loss-of-function studies in mouse and zebrafish embryos that eliminate retinoic acid synthesis or retinoic acid receptors (RARs) have revealed abnormal development of the somites, forelimb buds, heart, hindbrain, spinal cord, eye, forebrain basal ganglia, kidney, foregut endoderm, etc.

== Related pharmaceuticals ==
- Talarozole
- Tretinoin / all-trans retinoic acid (Tradename: Retin-A)
- Isotretinoin / 13-cis retinoic acid (Tradename: Accutane(US), Roaccutane)
- Alitretinoin / 9-cis retinoic acid
- Tamibarotene / RAR-alpha agonist
- Trifarotene
- Adapalene
- Aciretin
