= Van Dorp =

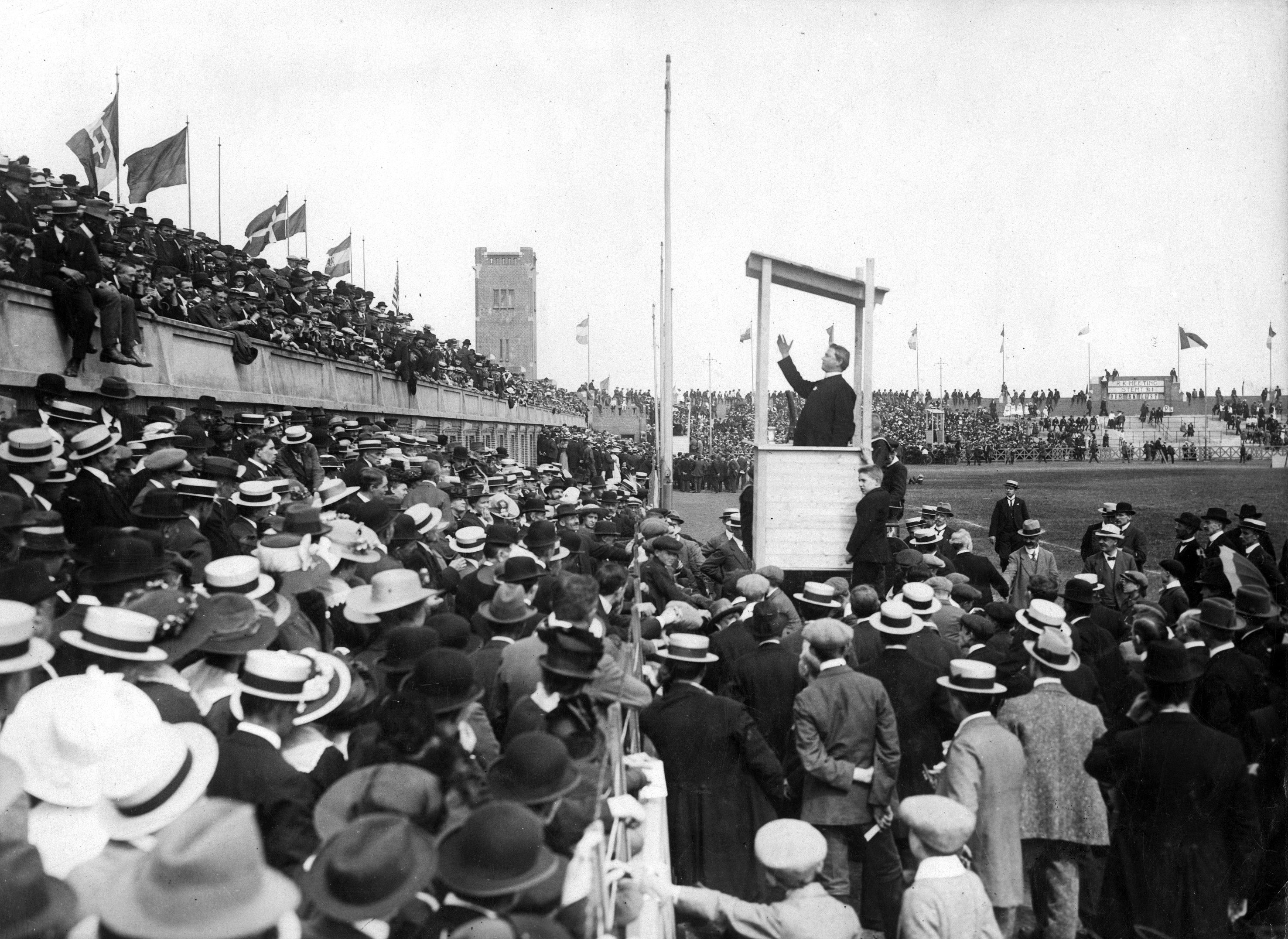
Van drop

Van Dorp may refer to:

- David Adriaan van Dorp (1915–1995), Dutch chemist
- Fred van Dorp (1938–2023), Dutch water polo player
- Lizzy van Dorp (1872–1945) Dutch lawyer
- Simon van Dorp (born 1997), Dutch rower
- Tony van Dorp (1936–2010), Dutch-American water polo player, brother of Fred
- Wayne Van Dorp (born 1961), Canadian hockey player
