= Fertilysin =

Chemical compound

Clinical data
- Other names: WIN 18446

Identifiers
- IUPAC name: 2,2-Dichloro-N-[8-[(2,2-dichloroacetyl)amino]octyl]acetamide
- CAS Number: 1477-57-2
- PubChem CID: 15134
- ChemSpider: 14405
- UNII: 3F56RA64JN
- ChEBI: CHEBI:90441
- ChEMBL: ChEMBL3276621
- CompTox Dashboard (EPA): DTXSID80163783
- ECHA InfoCard: 100.014.576

Chemical and physical data
- Formula: C_{12}H_{20}Cl_{4}N_{2}O_{2}
- Molar mass: 366.10 g·mol^{−1}
- 3D model (JSmol): Interactive image
- SMILES: ClC(C(NCCCCCCCCNC(C(Cl)Cl)=O)=O)Cl
- InChI: InChI=1S/C12H20Cl4N2O2/c13-9(14)11(19)17-7-5-3-1-2-4-6-8-18-12(20)10(15)16/h9-10H,1-8H2,(H,17,19)(H,18,20); Key:FAOMZVDZARKPFJ-UHFFFAOYSA-N

Fertilysin (WIN 18446) is an experimental drug that was studied as a male contraceptive, but was never marketed. It interferes with testicular production of retinoic acid, which is necessary for spermatogenesis. In studies in male animals including rodents, wolves, cats, and shrews, fertilysin was found to be a safe, effective, and reversible oral contraceptive. However, the side effects observed in human clinical trials preclude its use in men.

Fertilysin was originally studied in the 1950s for its potential amebicidal effects. When the anti-spermatogenesis effects were observed in animal studies, the focus of the research turned towards its potential use as a contraceptive. Fertilysin is an inhibitor of aldehyde dehydrogenase 1a2, a member of the aldehyde dehydrogenase family of enzymes. Inhibition of this enzyme blocks the production of retinoic acid which prevents the production of sperm. Because aldehyde dehydrogenases are also involved in the metabolism of ethanol, fertilysin has side effects similar to the action of disulfiram (Antabuse). Fertilysin may also have teratogenic effects.
