= All-trans-retinyl ester 13-cis isomerohydrolase =

all-trans-Retinyl ester 13-cis isomerohydrolase

Identifiers
- EC no.: 3.1.1.90

Databases
- BRENDA: enzyme data
- ExPASy: NiceZyme view
- KEGG: enzyme entry
- MetaCyc: metabolic pathway
- Rhea: reactions
- PDB structures: RCSB PDB PDBe PDBsum
Search
- PMC: articles
- PubMed: articles
- NCBI: proteins

The enzyme all-trans-retinyl ester 13-cis isomerohydrolase (EC 3.1.1.90; systematic name all-trans-retinyl ester acylhydrolase, 13-cis retinol forming catalyses the reaction

an all-trans-retinyl ester + H_{2}O $\rightleftharpoons$ 13-cis-retinol + a fatty acid

It probably participates in the endogenous production of 13-cis-retinoic acid (better known as the medication isotretinoin) in vertebrates.
