= ALDH1A1 =

Protein-coding gene in the species Homo sapiens

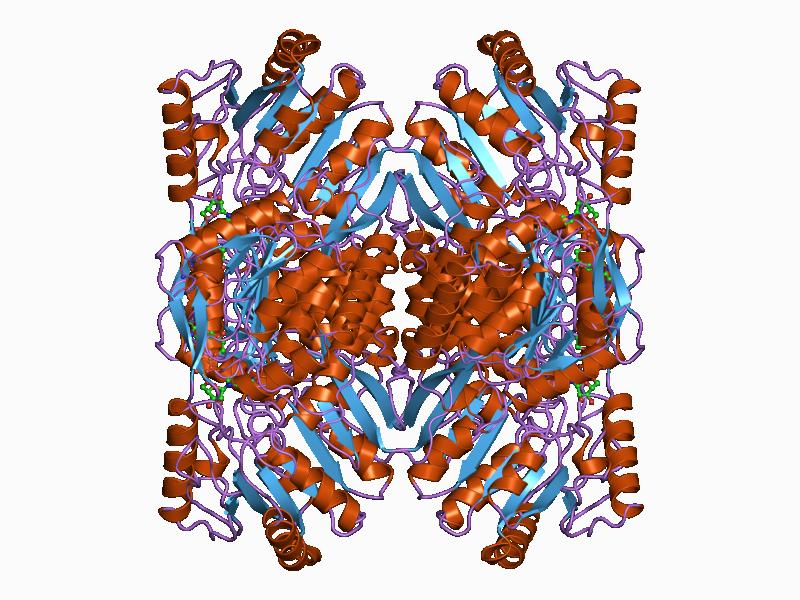

Identifiers
- Aliases: ALDH1A1, ALDC, ALDH-E1, ALDH1, ALDH11, HEL-9, HEL-S-53e, HEL12, PUMB1, RALDH1, aldehyde dehydrogenase 1 family member A1
- External IDs: OMIM: 100640; MGI: 1353450; GeneCards: ALDH1A1
Available structures
PDB	Ortholog search: PDBe RCSB
PDB	List of PDB id codes 4WB9, 4WJ9, 4WP7, 4WPN, 4X4L, 5AC2
Enzyme activity
EC #	BRENDA	ExPASy	KEGG	MetaCyc
1.2.1.3	↗	↗	↗	↗
1.2.1.19	↗	↗	↗	↗
1.2.1.28	↗	↗	↗	↗
1.2.1.36	↗	↗	↗	↗

Gene location (Human)
Chr.	Chromosome 9 (human)
Band	9q21.13	Start	72,900,671 bp
Band	9q21.13	End	73,080,442 bp

Gene location (Mouse)
Chr.	Chromosome 19 (mouse)
Band	19 B|19 13.91 cM	Start	20,492,715 bp
Band	19 B|19 13.91 cM	End	20,643,462 bp
RNA expression pattern
Bgee	Human / Mouse (ortholog); Top expressed in: bronchial epithelial cell; nasal epithelium; mucosa of paranasal sinus; islet of Langerhans; jejunal mucosa; olfactory zone of nasal mucosa; duodenum; corpus epididymis; pars reticulata; body of pancreas / Top expressed in: right lung lobe; epithelium of lens; ventral tegmental area; left lobe of liver; substantia nigra; superior surface of tongue; gallbladder; Gonadal ridge; epithelium of stomach; ciliary body; More reference expression data
BioGPS	n/a
Gene ontology
Molecular function	oxidoreductase activity; benzaldehyde dehydrogenase (NAD+) activity; androgen binding; aldehyde dehydrogenase (NAD+) activity; GTPase activator activity; nucleotide binding; retinal dehydrogenase activity; NAD binding; oxidoreductase activity, acting on the aldehyde or oxo group of donors, NAD or NADP as acceptor
Cellular component	cytoplasm; extracellular exosome; cytosol
Biological process	retinol metabolic process; cellular aldehyde metabolic process; metabolism; ethanol oxidation; positive regulation of GTPase activity; fructose catabolic process to hydroxyacetone phosphate and glyceraldehyde-3-phosphate; retinoid metabolic process; negative regulation of cold-induced thermogenesis
Sources:Amigo / QuickGO
Orthologs
Databases	NCBI: entry; OMA: entry
Species	Human	Mouse
Entrez	216	11668
Ensembl	ENSG00000165092	ENSMUSG00000053279
UniProt	P00352	P24549
RefSeq (mRNA)	NM_000689	NM_013467
RefSeq (protein)	NP_000680	NP_038495; NP_001348432; NP_001348433; NP_001348434; NP_001348435
Location (UCSC)	Chr 9: 72.9 – 73.08 Mb	Chr 19: 20.49 – 20.64 Mb
PubMed search
- Wikidata
View/Edit Human	View/Edit Mouse

Aldehyde dehydrogenase 1 family, member A1, also known as ALDH1A1 or retinaldehyde dehydrogenase 1 (RALDH1), is an enzyme that is encoded by the ALDH1A1 gene.

== Function ==
This protein belongs to the aldehyde dehydrogenases family of proteins and is a member of the ALDH1 subfamily (including ALDH1A2, ALDH1A3, ALDH1B1, ALDH2). Aldehyde dehydrogenase isozymes are NAD(P)-dependent dehydrogenases that catalyze the oxidation of an aldehyde into the corresponding carboxylic acid while reducing NAD+ or NADP+. ALDH1A1 is the only ALDH1 isozyme known to oxidize 9-cis retinaldehyde into 9-cis retinoic acid and thus serve as the only known activator of the retinoid nuclear receptor pathway. ALDH1A1 has also been described with activity against other substrates in living systems, including all-trans retinaldehyde as well as oxazaphosphorine, a cyclophosphamide metabolite. Unique among the ALDH1 isozymes, ALDH1A1 is known to possess esterase activity in biochemical studies, although it is unclear whether this is functionally relevant living tissues.

ALDH1A1 is expressed predominantly in metabolic tissues, including the liver, gastrointestinal tract, thyroid, pituitary gland, and adipose tissues. ALDH1A1 is also expressed in the testes where its function in spermatogenesis is subordinate to and compensatory for ALDH1A2 in mice. ALDH1A1 is inhibited by Antabuse (disulfiram), though the primary pharmacologic target of disulfiram in clinical use is ALDH2. The long clinical history of disulfiram use suggests that ALDH1A1 is not important to normal human physiology. Tumors, specifically in ovarian cancer are found to have a high expression of ALDH1A1. ALDH1A1 is found to cause resistance to chemotherapy.

== Clinical significance ==
=== Obesity ===
The removal of ALDH1A1 in mice through genetic knockout results in viable animals that are fertile and healthy. The only validated phenotype of these mice is a resistance to high fat diet-induced obesity while whole body ALDH1A1 removal does not affect fertility or neurological function. This biology closely replicates the clinical profile of Antabuse (disulfiram). Disulfiram and other ALDH1A1 inhibitors have been shown to cause ALDH1A1-dependent weight loss in obese animals. This has increased interest in disulfiram as an alternative weight loss therapy to Ozempic, yet the rare but potentially fatal liver-damaging effects of disulfiram due to its broad lack of selectivity as well as the alcohol-disulfiram reaction make it unattractive as a weight loss therapy. Subsequent efforts to produce ALDH1A1-specific inhibitors have resulted in preclinical compounds that induce weight loss through increased metabolic activity.

== Errors due to historical nomenclature ==
ALDH1A1 is often attributed with multiple biological roles as studies prior to human genome sequencing operated under the assumption that only one ALDH1 gene existed rather than the five isozymes that are annotated today. Accordingly, ALDH1A1 is often attributed with a role in alcohol metabolism through oxidation of acetaldehyde, however, single nucleotide polymorphisms (SNPs) in this enzyme show little evidence of linkage to alcoholism in humans. Despite established naming conventions, many studies still incorrectly use ALDH1 to describe the family of isozymes. For instance, many cancers studies have been interpreted to report on ALDH1A1 activity when the actual protein was ALDH1A3.

== Species-specific expression ==
ALDH1A1 possesses unique taxon-specific traits across mammals. Found uniquely in rabbits compared to other mammals, ALDH1A1 appears to function as a corneal crystallin that helps to maintain the transparency of the cornea. In other species such as humans, this role is performed by ALDH3A1. In beavers, the ALDH1A1 gene has undergone genomic expansion, resulting in approximately 10 copies of the genomic locus, which is putatively linked to a role in lipid balance.
