= David Adriaan van Dorp =

Dutch chemist (1915–1995)

- Born: 27 April 1915; Amsterdam
- Died: 19 February 1995 (aged 79); Vlaardingen
- Education: University of Amsterdam (PhD 1941)
- Known for: Full synthesis of vitamin A
- Scientific career
- Fields: Organic chemistry
- Institutions: Organon, Unilever
- Thesis: Aneurine en gistphosphatase

David 'Davy' Adriaan van Dorp (April 27, 1915, in Amsterdam – February 19, 1995, in Vlaardingen) was a Dutch chemist.

== Biography ==
Van Dorp was born as the son of Hendrik van Dorp and Maria van Dorp, and studied chemistry in Amsterdam where he received a PhD for his thesis Aneurine en gistphosphatase in 1941.

In 1946, while employed by the Dutch company Organon in Oss, Van Dorp and Jozef Ferdinand Arens ('Coco') (1914–2001) published the synthesis for vitamin A acid in the scientific journal Nature. In 1947, they completed the first full synthesis for the complex compound vitamin A, by taking the final step and turning the acid in an alcohol. Their synthesis was not to be used for commercial production, as an alternative route that was published soon after by Otto Isler (1910-1992) and co-workers at (Hoffmann-La Roche) turned out to be much more suited for upscaling.

Van Dorp joined the Unilever Research Laboratory in Vlaardingen in 1959, and was a key person in the studies regarding the role of arachidonic acid in the metabolic pathway to prostaglandin E2, in close cooperation with Sune K. Bergström who would later receive a Nobel Prize for his work on prostaglandins.

In 1973 he became member of the Royal Netherlands Academy of Arts and Sciences.
