= CYP16 family =

Group of cytochrome P450 enzymes

Cytochrome P450, family 16, also known as CYP16, is an animal cytochrome P450 monooxygenase family. This family was the last vertebrate CYP family recognized, and is absent from the mammal and zebrafish genome, but found in other fish and many invertebrates including some very old branches, such as Trichoplax and Oscarella carmela. Synteny mapping of CYP16 family members showing linkages to CYP26 family members, means the tetrapod's CYP26 may evolved from CYP16 of fish.

In the past, CYP16 family refers to some nematoda (roundworms) genes, which have been discontinued and changed to the Cytochrome P450, family 13, subfamily B (CYP13B), because its genetic relationship with the subfamily CYP13A.
