= Trifarotene =

Chemical compound

Clinical data
- Trade names: Aklief, Selgamis
- Other names: CD5789
- AHFS/Drugs.com: Monograph
- MedlinePlus: a620004
- License data: US DailyMed: Trifarotene
- Pregnancy category: AU: D; Contraindicated
- Routes of administration: Topical
- Drug class: Skin and mucous membrane agents
- ATC code: D10AD06 (WHO)

Legal status
- Legal status: AU: S4 (Prescription only); CA: ℞-only; UK: POM (Prescription only); US: ℞-only; Rx-only

Identifiers
- IUPAC name: 4-[3-(3-tert-Butyl-4-pyrrolidin-1-ylphenyl)-4-(2-hydroxyethoxy)phenyl]benzoic acid
- CAS Number: 895542-09-3
- PubChem CID: 11518241
- DrugBank: DB12808
- ChemSpider: 9693029
- UNII: 0J8RN2W0HK
- KEGG: D11225
- ChEMBL: ChEMBL3707313
- CompTox Dashboard (EPA): DTXSID30237781
- ECHA InfoCard: 100.278.901

Chemical and physical data
- Formula: C_{29}H_{33}NO_{4}
- Molar mass: 459.586 g·mol^{−1}
- 3D model (JSmol): Interactive image
- SMILES: CC(C)(C)c1cc(-c2cc(-c3ccc(C(=O)O)cc3)ccc2OCCO)ccc1N1CCCC1
- InChI: InChI=1S/C29H33NO4/c1-29(2,3)25-19-23(10-12-26(25)30-14-4-5-15-30)24-18-22(11-13-27(24)34-17-16-31)20-6-8-21(9-7-20)28(32)33/h6-13,18-19,31H,4-5,14-17H2,1-3H3,(H,32,33); Key:MFBCDACCJCDGBA-UHFFFAOYSA-N

Trifarotene, sold under the brand name Aklief, is a medication for the topical treatment of acne vulgaris. It is a retinoid; specifically, a fourth-generation selective retinoic acid receptor (RAR)-γ agonist.

Trifarotene was granted orphan drug designation for the treatment of congenital ichthyosis by both the U.S. Food and Drug Administration (FDA) and the European Medicines Agency (EMA). It was approved for medical use in the United States in October 2019. In December 2019, its labelling and package leaflet text received a decentralised approval for 16 European countries.

== Medical uses ==
In the United States, trifarotene is indicated for the topical treatment of acne vulgaris in people nine years of age and older. In both Canada and Australia, it is indicated for the topical treatment of acne vulgaris of the face and/or the trunk in people twelve years of age and older.

== Side effects ==
Most adverse effects of topical trifarotene for the treatment of acne are at the location site and transient, such as application site irritation, allergic dermatitis, skin irritation and sunburn. Even though systemic absorption is very low, use of trifarotene is still contraindicated during pregnancy because of the known risk of teratogenicity of the overall class of drugs trifarotene belongs to, retinoids.

== Society and culture ==
=== Legal status ===
Trifarotene was approved for medical use in the United States in October 2019, in Canada in November 2019, and in Australia in January 2021.
