= CYP26C1 =

Protein-coding gene in the species Homo sapiens

Identifiers
- Aliases: CYP26C1, FFDD4, cytochrome P450 family 26 subfamily C member 1
- External IDs: OMIM: 608428; MGI: 2679699; GeneCards: CYP26C1
Enzyme activity
EC #	BRENDA	ExPASy	KEGG	MetaCyc
1.14.14.1	↗	↗	↗	↗

Gene location (Human)
Chr.	Chromosome 10 (human)
Band	10q23.33	Start	93,060,798 bp
Band	10q23.33	End	93,069,540 bp

Gene location (Mouse)
Chr.	Chromosome 19 (mouse)
Band	19|19 C2	Start	37,674,029 bp
Band	19|19 C2	End	37,681,846 bp
RNA expression pattern
Bgee	Human / Mouse (ortholog); Top expressed in: gonad; prefrontal cortex; olfactory zone of nasal mucosa; placenta; spleen; myometrium; substantia nigra; C1 segment; hippocampus proper; hypothalamus / Top expressed in: pharyngeal arch; tail of embryo; embryo; embryo; desmocranium; amnion; tongue; enamel organ; maxillary prominence; surface ectoderm; More reference expression data
BioGPS	n/a
Gene ontology
Molecular function	iron ion binding; oxidoreductase activity; retinoic acid binding; heme binding; oxidoreductase activity, acting on paired donors, with incorporation or reduction of molecular oxygen; metal ion binding; monooxygenase activity; retinoic acid 4-hydroxylase activity
Cellular component	integral component of membrane; endoplasmic reticulum membrane; membrane
Biological process	negative regulation of retinoic acid receptor signaling pathway; central nervous system development; retinoic acid catabolic process; organelle fusion; vitamin metabolic process; neural crest cell development; anterior/posterior pattern specification; sterol metabolic process
Sources:Amigo / QuickGO
Orthologs
Databases	NCBI: entry; OMA: entry
Species	Human	Mouse
Entrez	340665	546726
Ensembl	ENSG00000187553	ENSMUSG00000062432
UniProt	Q6V0L0	B2RXA7
RefSeq (mRNA)	NM_183374	NM_001105201
RefSeq (protein)	NP_899230	NP_001098671
Location (UCSC)	Chr 10: 93.06 – 93.07 Mb	Chr 19: 37.67 – 37.68 Mb
PubMed search
- Wikidata
View/Edit Human	View/Edit Mouse

CYP26C1 (cytochrome P450, family 26, subfamily c, polypeptide 1) is a protein which in humans is encoded by the CYP26C1 gene.

This gene encodes a member of the cytochrome P450 superfamily of enzymes. The cytochrome P450 proteins are monooxygenases which catalyze many reactions involved in drug metabolism and synthesis of cholesterol, steroids and other lipids. This enzyme is involved in the catabolism of all-trans- and 9-cis-retinoic acid, and thus contributes to the regulation of retinoic acid levels in cells and tissues.

CYP26C1 was found to show no expression in colorectal cancer cells or normal colonic epithelium.
