= CYP26A1 =

Protein-coding gene in the species Homo sapiens

Identifiers
- Aliases: CYP26A1, CP26, CYP26, P450RAI, P450RAI1, cytochrome P450 family 26 subfamily A member 1
- External IDs: OMIM: 602239; MGI: 1096359; GeneCards: CYP26A1

Gene location (Human)
Chr.	Chromosome 10 (human)
Band	10q23.33	Start	93,073,475 bp
Band	10q23.33	End	93,077,885 bp

Gene location (Mouse)
Chr.	Chromosome 19 (mouse)
Band	19|19 C2	Start	37,686,246 bp
Band	19|19 C2	End	37,689,984 bp
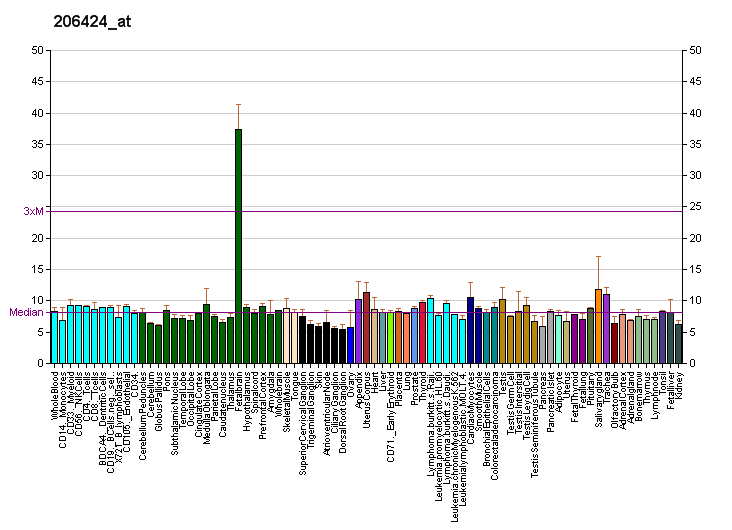
RNA expression pattern
Bgee	Human / Mouse (ortholog); Top expressed in: right lobe of liver; olfactory zone of nasal mucosa; gonad; placenta; endometrium; prefrontal cortex; superior frontal gyrus; Brodmann area 9; anterior cingulate cortex; right frontal lobe / Top expressed in: molar; tail of embryo; otic vesicle; epithelium of lens; primitive streak; otic placode; epiblast; embryo; left lobe of liver; embryonic cloaca; More reference expression data
BioGPS	More reference expression data
Gene ontology
Molecular function	iron ion binding; oxygen binding; oxidoreductase activity; retinoic acid binding; heme binding; oxidoreductase activity, acting on paired donors, with incorporation or reduction of molecular oxygen; metal ion binding; monooxygenase activity; oxidoreductase activity, acting on paired donors, with incorporation or reduction of molecular oxygen, NAD(P)H as one donor, and incorporation of one atom of oxygen; retinoic acid 4-hydroxylase activity
Cellular component	organelle membrane; endoplasmic reticulum membrane; endoplasmic reticulum; membrane; intracellular membrane-bounded organelle
Biological process	negative regulation of retinoic acid receptor signaling pathway; retinoic acid catabolic process; vitamin metabolic process; xenobiotic metabolic process; sterol metabolic process; response to retinoic acid; response to vitamin A; retinoic acid metabolic process; kidney development
Sources:Amigo / QuickGO
Orthologs
Databases	NCBI: entry; OMA: entry
Species	Human	Mouse
Entrez	1592	13082
Ensembl	ENSG00000095596	ENSMUSG00000024987
UniProt	O43174	O55127
RefSeq (mRNA)	NM_057157; NM_000783	NM_007811
RefSeq (protein)	NP_000774; NP_476498	NP_031837
Location (UCSC)	Chr 10: 93.07 – 93.08 Mb	Chr 19: 37.69 – 37.69 Mb
PubMed search
- Wikidata
View/Edit Human	View/Edit Mouse

Cytochrome P450 26A1 is a protein that in humans is encoded by the CYP26A1 gene.

== Function ==
This gene encodes a member of the cytochrome P450 superfamily of enzymes. The cytochrome P450 proteins are monooxygenases which catalyze many reactions involved in drug metabolism and synthesis of cholesterol, steroids and other lipids. This endoplasmic reticulum protein acts on retinoids, including all-trans-retinoic acid (RA), with both 4-hydroxylation and 18-hydroxylation activities. This enzyme regulates the cellular level of retinoic acid which is involved in regulation of gene expression in both embryonic and adult tissues. Two alternatively spliced transcript variants of this gene, which encode the distinct isoforms, have been reported.

CYP26A1 is over-expressed in colorectal cancer cells compared to normal colonic epithelium but is of no independent prognostic value in patients with colorectal cancer.
