= ALDH1A3 =

Protein-coding gene in the species Homo sapiens

Identifiers
- Aliases: ALDH1A3, ALDH1A6, ALDH6, MCOP8, RALDH3, aldehyde dehydrogenase 1 family member A3
- External IDs: OMIM: 600463; MGI: 1861722; GeneCards: ALDH1A3
Enzyme activity
EC #	BRENDA	ExPASy	KEGG	MetaCyc
1.2.1.36	↗	↗	↗	↗

Gene location (Human)
Chr.	Chromosome 15 (human)
Band	15q26.3	Start	100,877,714 bp
Band	15q26.3	End	100,916,626 bp

Gene location (Mouse)
Chr.	Chromosome 7 (mouse)
Band	7|7 C	Start	66,040,638 bp
Band	7|7 C	End	66,077,265 bp
RNA expression pattern
Bgee	Human / Mouse (ortholog); Top expressed in: palpebral conjunctiva; retinal pigment epithelium; parietal pleura; parotid gland; prostate; germinal epithelium; periodontal fiber; urethra; minor salivary glands; tail of epididymis / Top expressed in: vestibular sensory epithelium; saccule; utricle; nasal placode; corneal stroma; conjunctival fornix; medullary collecting duct; renal pelvis; cochlear nerve; corneal epithelium; More reference expression data
BioGPS	n/a
Gene ontology
Molecular function	protein homodimerization activity; aldehyde dehydrogenase [NAD(P)+ activity]; NAD+ binding; oxidoreductase activity; aldehyde dehydrogenase (NAD+) activity; thyroid hormone binding; retinal dehydrogenase activity; oxidoreductase activity, acting on the aldehyde or oxo group of donors, NAD or NADP as acceptor
Cellular component	cytoplasm; extracellular exosome; nucleus; cytosol; plasma membrane
Biological process	locomotory behavior; neuromuscular process controlling balance; retinol metabolic process; embryonic eye morphogenesis; nucleus accumbens development; retinoic acid metabolic process; olfactory pit development; retinal metabolic process; face development; inner ear morphogenesis; positive regulation of apoptotic process; optic cup morphogenesis involved in camera-type eye development; metabolism; righting reflex; retinoic acid biosynthetic process; embryonic camera-type eye development; nose development; protein homotetramerization; Harderian gland development
Sources:Amigo / QuickGO
Orthologs
Databases	NCBI: entry; OMA: entry
Species	Human	Mouse
Entrez	220	56847
Ensembl	ENSG00000184254	ENSMUSG00000015134
UniProt	P47895	Q9JHW9
RefSeq (mRNA)	NM_001293815; NM_000693; NM_001037224	NM_053080
RefSeq (protein)	NP_000684; NP_001280744	NP_444310
Location (UCSC)	Chr 15: 100.88 – 100.92 Mb	Chr 7: 66.04 – 66.08 Mb
PubMed search
- Wikidata
View/Edit Human	View/Edit Mouse

Aldehyde dehydrogenase 1 family, member A3 (ALDH1a3), also known as retinaldehyde dehydrogenase 3 (RALDH3) or as ALDH6 in earlier published studies, is an enzyme that in humans is encoded by the ALDH1A3 gene.,

== Function ==
Aldehyde dehydrogenase isozymes are NAD(P)-dependent dehydrogenases that catalyze the oxidation of an aldehyde into the corresponding carboxylic acid while reducing NAD+ or NADP+. ALDH1a3 oxidizes all-trans retinaldehyde into all-trans retinoic acid and thus serves as the final catalytic step in the activation of the retinoid nuclear receptor (RAR) pathway. While ALDH1a3 and related isozymes are known to utilize many aldehyde substrates in biochemical experiments, genetic and functional analysis demonstrates that ALDH1a3 functions only to oxidize all-trans retinaldehyde in living systems. ALDH1a3 exists as a homotetramer with cytosolic localization. It is not known to have any function in healthy adult tissues. ALDH1a3 contains a catalytic cysteine residue which is only minimally inhibited by the ALDH2-targeted drug disulfiram. While no specific ALDH1a3 inhibitors have been tested in humans, the pan-ALDH1 inhibitor Win18446 (Fertilysin) was tested in humans for 23 weeks with no observed adverse effects.

The function of ALDH1a3 is known to be restricted to early fetal development and is dispensable in either adult mammals or healthy adult humans. ALDH1a3 is a potential therapeutic target in type 2 diabetes. cardiovascular disorders, and cancer where its expression is amplified and it has known pathogenic activity. ALDH1a3 is not necessary for spermatogenesis or the visual cycle.

== Clinical significance ==
=== Type 2 Diabetes ===
ALDH1a3 is established as a primary marker of failing beta cells in the pancreas, both in human type 2 diabetes patients and mouse models of diabetes. ALDH1a3 expression has been shown to suppress insulin secretion and increase glucagon production in laboratory experiments. ALDH1a3 was more recently established as a driver of beta cell failure and thus type 2 diabetes in a retinoid-dependent mechanism. Genetic and pharmacologic experiments with recently described ALDH1a3 inhibitors suggest that ALDH1a3 is a potential target to reverse beta cell decline in type 2 diabetes and thus restore insulin independence.

=== Cardiovascular Disorders ===
ALDH1a3 is activated in injured or inflamed vascular smooth muscle cells in the context of pulmonary arterial hypertension and neointimal hyperplasia. Activation of ALDH1a3 in these cells causes vascular wall thickening and narrowing of pulmonary arteries, leading to disease progression. Chronic activation of the retinoid nuclear receptor causes increases in mortality due to heart failure.

=== Cancer ===
ALDH1a3 is expressed in many cancer types while it is not expressed in the normal cells from which those cancers are derived. There is extensive literature evidence for the selective enrichment of ALDH1a3 across many cancers, including melanoma, glioblastoma, lung cancer, pancreatic cancer, breast cancer, sarcomas and many other cancer types. While the putative role of ALDH1a3 in each of these cancers is via activation of the retinoid pathway, many studies disagree on its mechanism. A unifying theory for its activity in cancer was described through the generation of all-trans retinoic acid that acts in a paracrine manner on immune cells in the tumor microenvironment.
