= Biotinylated retinoids =

Biotinylated retinoids are derivatives of retinol (vitamin A) carrying a biotin group for use in the isolation and purification of Retinol Binding Proteins involved in the visual cycle. The first biotinylated retinoid was synthesized in 2002 and was used in the isolation and characterization of RPE65.
