= All-trans-retinol 13,14-reductase =

Class of enzymes

RETSAT

Identifiers
- Aliases: RETSAT, retinol saturase, All-trans-retinol 13,14-reductase
- External IDs: OMIM: 617597; MGI: 1914692; GeneCards: RETSAT
Enzyme activity
EC #	BRENDA	ExPASy	KEGG	MetaCyc
1.3.99.23	↗	↗	↗	↗

Gene location (Human)
Chr.	Chromosome 2 (human)
Band	2p11.2	Start	85,341,955 bp
Band	2p11.2	End	85,354,531 bp

Gene location (Mouse)
Chr.	Chromosome 6 (mouse)
Band	6|6 C1	Start	72,575,458 bp
Band	6|6 C1	End	72,585,408 bp
RNA expression pattern
Bgee	Human / Mouse (ortholog); Top expressed in: mucosa of transverse colon; mucosa of ileum; jejunal mucosa; rectum; duodenum; subcutaneous adipose tissue; right adrenal cortex; left adrenal gland; left adrenal cortex; abdominal fat / Top expressed in: left lobe of liver; right kidney; duodenum; brown adipose tissue; human kidney; proximal tubule; epithelium of stomach; yolk sac; pyloric antrum; digastric muscle; More reference expression data
BioGPS	More reference expression data
Gene ontology
Molecular function	oxidoreductase activity; all-trans-retinol 13,14-reductase activity
Cellular component	nuclear membrane; nuclear outer membrane; membrane; endoplasmic reticulum; endoplasmic reticulum membrane
Biological process	retinol metabolic process
Sources:Amigo / QuickGO
Orthologs
Databases	NCBI: entry; OMA: entry
Species	Human	Mouse
Entrez	54884	67442
Ensembl	ENSG00000042445	ENSMUSG00000056666
UniProt	Q6NUM9	Q64FW2
RefSeq (mRNA)	NM_017750	NM_026159
RefSeq (protein)	NP_060220	NP_080435
Location (UCSC)	Chr 2: 85.34 – 85.35 Mb	Chr 6: 72.58 – 72.59 Mb
PubMed search
- Wikidata
View/Edit Human	View/Edit Mouse

all-trans-retinol 13,14-reductase

Identifiers
- EC no.: 1.3.99.23
- CAS no.: 418767-56-3

Databases
- BRENDA: enzyme data
- ExPASy: NiceZyme view
- KEGG: enzyme entry
- MetaCyc: metabolic pathway
- Rhea: reactions
- PDB structures: RCSB PDB PDBe PDBsum
- Gene Ontology: AmiGO / QuickGO
Search
- PMC: articles
- PubMed: articles
- NCBI: proteins

In enzymology, all-trans-retinol 13,14-reductase (EC 1.3.99.23) is an enzyme, encoded by the RETSAT gene, that catalyzes the chemical reaction

retinol
+ reduced acceptor
13,14-dihydroretinol
+ electron acceptor

The enzyme acts on retinol (vitamin A) to reduce it to 13,14-dihydroretinol. It is not known to be able to catalyze reaction in the opposite direction.

This enzyme belongs to the family of oxidoreductases, specifically those acting on the CH-CH group of donor with other acceptors. The systematic name of this enzyme class is all-trans-13,14-dihydroretinol:acceptor 13,14-oxidoreductase. Other names in common use include retinol saturase, RetSat, (13,14)-all-trans-retinol saturase, and all-trans-retinol:all-trans-13,14-dihydroretinol saturase.

The gene has also been called PPAR-alpha-regulated and starvation-induced gene protein.
