= Retinyl acetate =

Names
- IUPAC name (2E,4E,6E,8E)-3,7-Dimethyl-9-(2,6,6-trimethylcyclohex-1-en-1-yl)nona-2,4,6,8-tetraen-1-yl acetate
- Other names Retinol acetate; Vitamin A acetate; Vitamin A_{1} acetate; Acetylretinol; all-trans-Retinol acetate; all-trans-Retinyl acetate; all-trans-Vitamin A acetate;

Identifiers
CAS Number	127-47-9
3D model (JSmol)	Interactive image
Beilstein Reference	1915439
ChEBI	CHEBI:32095
ChEMBL	ChEMBL486193
ChemSpider	553599
ECHA InfoCard	100.004.405
EC Number	204-844-2
KEGG	D01621
PubChem CID	638034
UNII	3LE3D9D6OY
CompTox Dashboard (EPA)	DTXSID6021240
- InChI: InChI=1S/C22H32O2/c1-17(9-7-10-18(2)14-16-24-20(4)23)12-13-21-19(3)11-8-15-22(21,5)6/h7,9-10,12-14H,8,11,15-16H2,1-6H3/b10-7+,13-12+,17-9+,18-14+ Key: QGNJRVVDBSJHIZ-QHLGVNSISA-N; InChI=1/C22H32O2/c1-17(9-7-10-18(2)14-16-24-20(4)23)12-13-21-19(3)11-8-15-22(21,5)6/h7,9-10,12-14H,8,11,15-16H2,1-6H3/b10-7+,13-12+,17-9+,18-14+ Key: QGNJRVVDBSJHIZ-QHLGVNSIBE
- SMILES: O=C(OC/C=C(/C=C/C=C(/C=C/C1=C(/CCCC1(C)C)C)C)C)C

Properties
Chemical formula	C_{22}H_{32}O_{2}
Molar mass	328.496 g·mol^{−1}
Melting point	57 to 58 °C (135 to 136 °F; 330 to 331 K)

Hazards
- GHS labelling
Pictograms	(GHS07: Exclamation mark) (GHS08: Health hazard)
Signal word	Warning
Hazard statements	H315, H361, H413
Precautionary statements	P201, P202, P264, P273, P280, P281, P302+P352, P308+P313, P321, P332+P313, P362, P405, P501
NFPA 704 (fire diamond)	1 1 0
- Except where otherwise noted, data are given for materials in their standard state (at 25 °C [77 °F], 100 kPa). Infobox references

Retinyl acetate (also called vitamin A acetate or all‑trans‑retinol acetate) is a synthetic, fat‑soluble acetate ester of retinol often used to supply vitamin A in food fortification, dietary supplements, and topical cosmetic products.

Because the acetyl group protects the alcohol functionality, the compound is markedly more stable to heat, oxygen and light than free retinol, yet is rapidly hydrolyzed in the human intestine to active retinol after ingestion.

Commercially, retinyl acetate is the second most common retinyl ester after retinyl palmitate.

== Chemical structure and properties ==
Retinyl acetate is the acetate ester of all‑trans‑retinol. Its polyene side chain makes the molecule highly lipophilic and sensitive to photo‑oxidation; antioxidants (e.g., tocopherol) and opaque packaging are therefore used to limit degradation in finished products.

The compound melts at ~59 °C and is practically insoluble in water but miscible with edible oils and most organic solvents.

== Metabolism and biochemistry ==
Dietary retinyl acetate is hydrolyzed in the intestinal lumen by pancreatic triglyceride lipase and by brush‑border phospholipase B, releasing free retinol. The retinol is absorbed, re‑esterified mainly with long‑chain fatty acids by lecithin‑retinol acyltransferase (LRAT) inside enterocytes, and secreted in chylomicrons to the liver, where 50–80 % of total‑body vitamin A is stored as retinyl palmitate in hepatic stellate cells. Mobilization of these stores releases retinol bound to retinol‑binding protein 4 (RBP4) for delivery to peripheral tissues.

== Industrial production and stability ==
Large‑scale vitamin A manufacture couples a C15 β‑ionone fragment with a C5 acetate side chain via a series of Wittig‑Horner and Grignard reactions, followed by final esterification or trans‑esterification to retinyl acetate. Modern processes achieve >95 % all‑trans selectivity and include crystallization or column purification under nitrogen to minimize isomerization.

== Applications ==
=== Food fortification ===
The United States Food and Drug Administration lists retinyl acetate as "Generally Recognized as Safe" (GRAS) for use as a nutrient supplement in foods (21 CFR 184.1930).

It is commonly added to margarine, plant‑based milk, breakfast cereals and staple oils in low‑ and middle‑income countries to prevent vitamin A deficiency.

=== Dietary supplements ===
Multivitamin tablets typically supply 600–900 μg retinol activity equivalents (RAE) from retinyl acetate or retinyl palmitate. The U.S. National Institutes of Health sets a Tolerable Upper Intake Level (UL) of 3 000 μg RAE day^{−1} for adults.

=== Cosmetics ===
Retinyl acetate is used in "anti‑aging" skin‑care formulations as a milder, more photo‑stable alternative to retinol. The EU Scientific Committee on Consumer Safety (SCCS) concluded in 2017, and reaffirmed in 2023, that leave‑on products are safe at concentrations providing up to 0.3 % retinol equivalents, while body lotions for children aged 1–3 years should not exceed 0.05 % retinol equivalents.

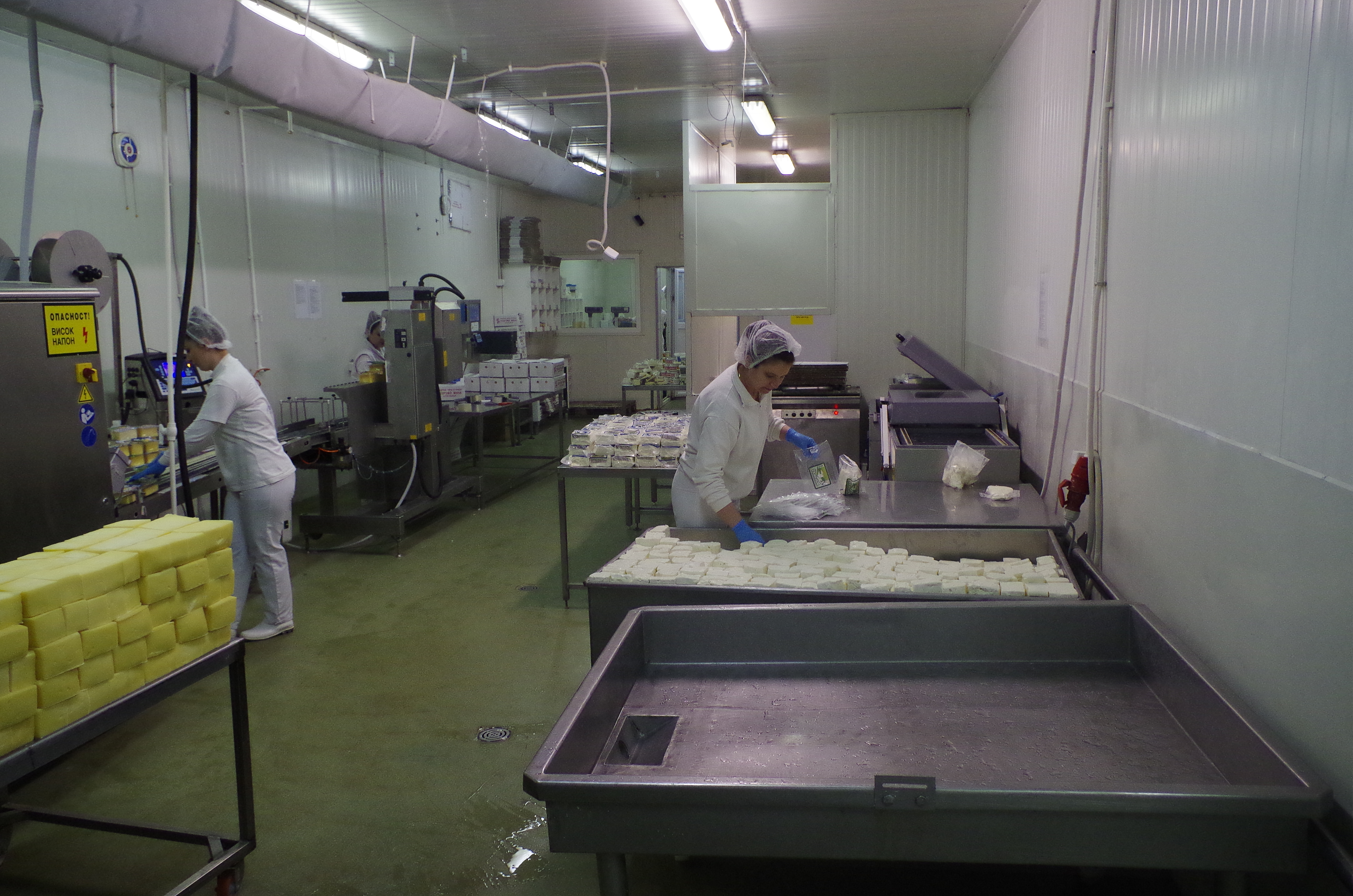

== Safety and toxicity ==
Excess pre‑formed vitamin A from supplements or fortified foods can cause hypervitaminosis A, characterized acutely by nausea and raised intracranial pressure and chronically by liver injury and teratogenicity.

Retinyl acetate shares these dose‑dependent toxicities because it is quantitatively hydrolyzed to retinol. Phototoxicity and photo‑isomerization are significantly lower than for unesterified retinol but can occur in formulations lacking UV stabilizers.

== Regulation ==
- United States: GRAS nutrient supplement (21 CFR 184.1930); dietary‑supplement labelling expresses content in μg RAE or International Units.
- European Union: Permitted as vitamin A source in fortified foods under Regulation (EC) 1925/2006; cosmetic concentrations limited as per SCCS opinion.
- Codex Alimentarius: Listed as an approved vitamin A fortificant for sugar, cereal flours and edible oils.

== See also ==
- Retinol
- Retinyl palmitate
- Vitamin A deficiency
- Hypervitaminosis A
