= Retinol O-fatty-acyltransferase =

Enzyme

retinol O-fatty-acyltransferase

Identifiers
- EC no.: 2.3.1.76
- CAS no.: 81295-48-9

Databases
- IntEnz: IntEnz view
- BRENDA: BRENDA entry
- ExPASy: NiceZyme view
- KEGG: KEGG entry
- MetaCyc: metabolic pathway
- PRIAM: profile
- PDB structures: RCSB PDB PDBe PDBsum
- Gene Ontology: AmiGO / QuickGO
Search
- PMC: articles
- PubMed: articles
- NCBI: proteins

In enzymology, a retinol O-fatty-acyltransferase (EC 2.3.1.76) is an enzyme that catalyzes the chemical reaction

acyl-CoA + retinol $\rightleftharpoons$ CoA + retinyl ester

Thus, the two substrates of this enzyme are acyl-CoA and retinol, whereas its two products are CoA and retinyl ester.

This enzyme belongs to the family of transferases, specifically those acyltransferases transferring groups other than aminoacyl groups. The systematic name of this enzyme class is acyl-CoA:retinol O-acyltransferase. Other names in common use include retinol acyltransferase, and retinol fatty-acyltransferase. This enzyme participates in retinol metabolism.
