= All-trans-retinyl-palmitate hydrolase =

retinoid isomerohydrolase

Identifiers
- EC no.: 3.1.1.64

Databases
- IntEnz: IntEnz view
- BRENDA: BRENDA entry
- ExPASy: NiceZyme view
- KEGG: KEGG entry
- MetaCyc: metabolic pathway
- PRIAM: profile
- PDB structures: RCSB PDB PDBe PDBsum
- Gene Ontology: AmiGO / QuickGO
Search
- PMC: articles
- PubMed: articles
- NCBI: proteins

The enzyme retinoid isomerohydrolase (EC 3.1.1.64, all-trans-retinyl-palmitate hydrolase) catalyzes the reaction

an all-trans-retinyl ester + H_{2}O = 11-cis-retinol + a fatty acid

This enzyme belongs to the family of hydrolases, specifically those acting on carboxylic ester bonds. The systematic name is all-trans-retinyl ester acylhydrolase, 11-cis retinol-forming. This enzyme participates in retinol metabolism.
