= Retinyl-palmitate esterase =

retinyl-palmitate esterase

Identifiers
- EC no.: 3.1.1.21
- CAS no.: 9063-69-8

Databases
- IntEnz: IntEnz view
- BRENDA: BRENDA entry
- ExPASy: NiceZyme view
- KEGG: KEGG entry
- MetaCyc: metabolic pathway
- PRIAM: profile
- PDB structures: RCSB PDB PDBe PDBsum
- Gene Ontology: AmiGO / QuickGO
Search
- PMC: articles
- PubMed: articles
- NCBI: proteins

In enzymology, a retinyl-palmitate esterase (EC 3.1.1.21) is an enzyme that catalyzes the chemical reaction.

retinyl palmitate + H_{2}O $\rightleftharpoons$ retinol + palmitate

Thus, the two substrates of this enzyme are retinyl palmitate and H_{2}O, whereas its two products are retinol and palmitate.

This enzyme belongs to the family of hydrolases, specifically those acting on carboxylic ester bonds. The systematic name of this enzyme class is retinyl-palmitate palmitohydrolase. Other names in common use include retinyl palmitate hydrolase, retinyl palmitate hydrolyase, and retinyl ester hydrolase. This enzyme participates in retinol metabolism.
