= Visual cycle =

Physiological process

The visual cycle is a process in the retina that replenishes the molecule retinal for its use in vision. Retinal is the chromophore of most visual opsins, meaning it captures the photons to begin the phototransduction cascade. When the photon is absorbed, the 11-cis retinal photoisomerizes into all-trans retinal as it is ejected from the opsin protein. Each molecule of retinal must travel from the photoreceptor cell to the RPE and back in order to be refreshed and combined with another opsin. This closed enzymatic pathway of 11-cis retinal is sometimes called Wald's visual cycle after George Wald (1906–1997), who received the Nobel Prize in 1967 for his work towards its discovery.

== Retinal ==
Retinal is a chromophore that forms photosensitive retinylidene proteins when covalently bound to proteins called opsins. Retinal can be photoisomerized by itself, but requires to be bound to an opsin protein to both trigger the phototransduction cascade and tune the spectral sensitivity to longer wavelengths, which enable color vision.

Retinal is a species of retinoid and the aldehyde form of vitamin A. Retinal is interconvertible with retinol, the transport and storage form of vitamin A. During the visual cycle, retinal moves between several different isomers and is also converted to retinol and retinyl ester. Retinoids can be derived from the oxidation of carotenoids like beta carotene or can be consumed directly. To reach the retina, it is bound to retinol binding protein (RBP) and transthyretin, which prevents its filtration in the glomeruli.

As in transport via the RBP-transthyretin pathway, retinoids must always be bound to chaperone molecules, for several reasons. Retinoids are toxic, insoluble in aqueous solutions, and prone to oxidation, and as such they must be bound and protected when within the body. The body uses a variety of chaperones, particularly in the retina, to transport retinoids.

== Overview ==
Visual cycle

The visual cycle is consistent within mammals, and is summarized as follows:

1. all-trans-retinyl ester + H_{2}O → 11-cis-retinol + fatty acid; RPE65 isomerohydrolases;
2. 11-cis-retinol + NAD^{+} → 11-cis-retinal + NADH + H^{+}; 11-cis-retinol dehydrogenases;
3. 11-cis-retinal + aporhodopsin → rhodopsin + H_{2}O; forms Schiff base linkage to lysine, -CH=N^{+}H-;
4. rhodopsin + hν → metarhodopsin II (i.e., 11-cis photoisomerizes to all-trans):
  (rhodopsin + hν → photorhodopsin → bathorhodopsin → lumirhodopsin → metarhodopsin I → metarhodopsin II);
5. metarhodopsin II + H_{2}O → aporhodopsin + all-trans-retinal;
6. all-trans-retinal + NADPH + H^{+} → all-trans-retinol + NADP^{+}; all-trans-retinol dehydrogenases;
7. all-trans-retinol + fatty acid → all-trans-retinyl ester + H_{2}O; lecithin retinol acyltransferases (LRATs).

Steps 3, 4, 5, and 6 occur in rod cell outer segments; steps 1, 2, and 7 occur in retinal pigment epithelium (RPE) cells.

== Description ==
When a photon is absorbed, 11-cis-retinal is transformed to all-trans-retinal, and it moves to the exit site of rhodopsin. It will not leave the opsin protein until another fresh chromophore comes to replace it, except for in the ABCR pathway. Whilst still bound to the opsin, all-trans-retinal is transformed into all-trans-retinol by all-trans-retinol dehydrogenase. It then proceeds to the cell membrane of the rod, where it is chaperoned to the retinal pigment epithelium (RPE) by interphotoreceptor retinoid-binding protein (IRBP). It then enters the RPE cells, and is transferred to the cellular retinol binding protein (CRBP) chaperone.

When inside the RPE cell, bound to CRBP, the all-trans-retinol is esterified by lecithin retinol acyltransferase (LRAT) to form a retinyl ester. The retinyl esters of the RPE are chaperoned by a protein known as RPE65. It is in this form that the RPE stores most of its retinoids, as the RPE stores 2-3 times more retinoids than the neural retina itself. When further chromophore is required, the retinyl esters are acted on by isomerohydrolase to produce 11-cis-retinol, which is transferred to the cellular retinaldehyde binding protein (CRALBP). 11-cis-Retinol is transformed into 11-cis retinal by 11-cis-retinol dehydrogenase, then it is shipped back to the photoreceptor cells via IRBP. There, it replaces the spent chromophore in opsin molecules, rendering the opsin photosensitive.

=== ABCR pathway ===
Under normal circumstances, the spent chromophore is discharged from the protein by an incoming "recharged" chromophore. However, sometimes the spent chromophore may leave the opsin protein prior to its replacement, when it is bound to the ABCA4 protein (also known as ABCR). At this stage, it is also transformed to all-trans-retinol, and then leaves the photoreceptor outer segment via the IRBP chaperone. It then follows the conventional visual cycle. It is from this pathway that the presence of opsin without a chromophore can be explained.

=== RGR regulation ===
The visual cycle can be regulated by the retinal G-protein-coupled receptor (RGR-opsin) system. When light activates the RGR-opsin, the recycling of chromophore in the RPE is accelerated. This mechanism provides additional chromophore after intense bleaches, and can be seen as an important mechanism in the early phases of dark adaptation and chromophore replenishment.

== Alternative cycles ==
=== Cone-specific visual cycle ===
It is believed that an alternative visual cycle exists, which uses Müller glial cells instead of retinal pigment epithelium. In this pathway, cones reduce all-trans retinal to all-trans retinol via all-trans retinol dehydrogenase, then transport all-trans retinol to Müller cells. There, it is transformed into 11-cis retinol by all-trans retinol isomerase, and can either be stored as retinyl esters within Müller cells, or transported back to the cone photoreceptors, where it is transformed from 11-cis retinol to 11-cis retinal by 11-cis retinal dehydrogenase. This pathway helps explain the rapid dark adaptation in the cone system, and the presence of 11-cis retinal dehydrogenase in cone photoreceptors, as it is not found in rods, only in the RPE.

=== Melanopsin visual cycle ===
Melanopsin is a visual opsin present in Intrinsically photosensitive retinal ganglion cell (ipRGC) also with a retinal chromophore. However, unlike the rod and cone pigments, melanopsin has the ability to act as both the excitable photopigment and as a photoisomerase. Melanopsin is therefore able to isomerize all-trans-retinal into 11-cis-retinal itself when stimulated with another photon. An ipRGC therefore does not rely on Müller cells and/or retinal pigment epithelium cells for this conversion.

== Leber's congenital amaurosis ==
A possible mechanism for Leber's congenital amaurosis has been proposed as the deficiency of RPE65. Without the RPE65 protein, the RPE is unable to store retinyl esters, and the visual cycle is therefore interrupted. At the beginning stages of the disease, the cone cells are unaffected, as they can rely on the alternate Muller cell visual cycle. However, rods do not have access to this alternative and are rendered inert. LCA therefore manifests as nyctalopia (night blindness). In the later stages of the disease, general retinopathy is observed as the rod cells lose their ability to signal. As a result, the rods continually secrete glutamate, a neurotransmitter, at a rate the Muller cells are unable to absorb. The glutamate levels will build up within the retina, where they will reach neurotoxic levels. The RPE65 deficiency would be genetic in origin, and is only one of many proposed possible pathophysiologies of the disease. However, there is a retinal gene therapy to reintroduce normal RPE65 genes that has been approved by the FDA since 2017.

== See also ==
- Visual phototransduction
- Visual system
