= Vitamin A deficiency =

Disease resulting from low vitamin A concentrations in the body

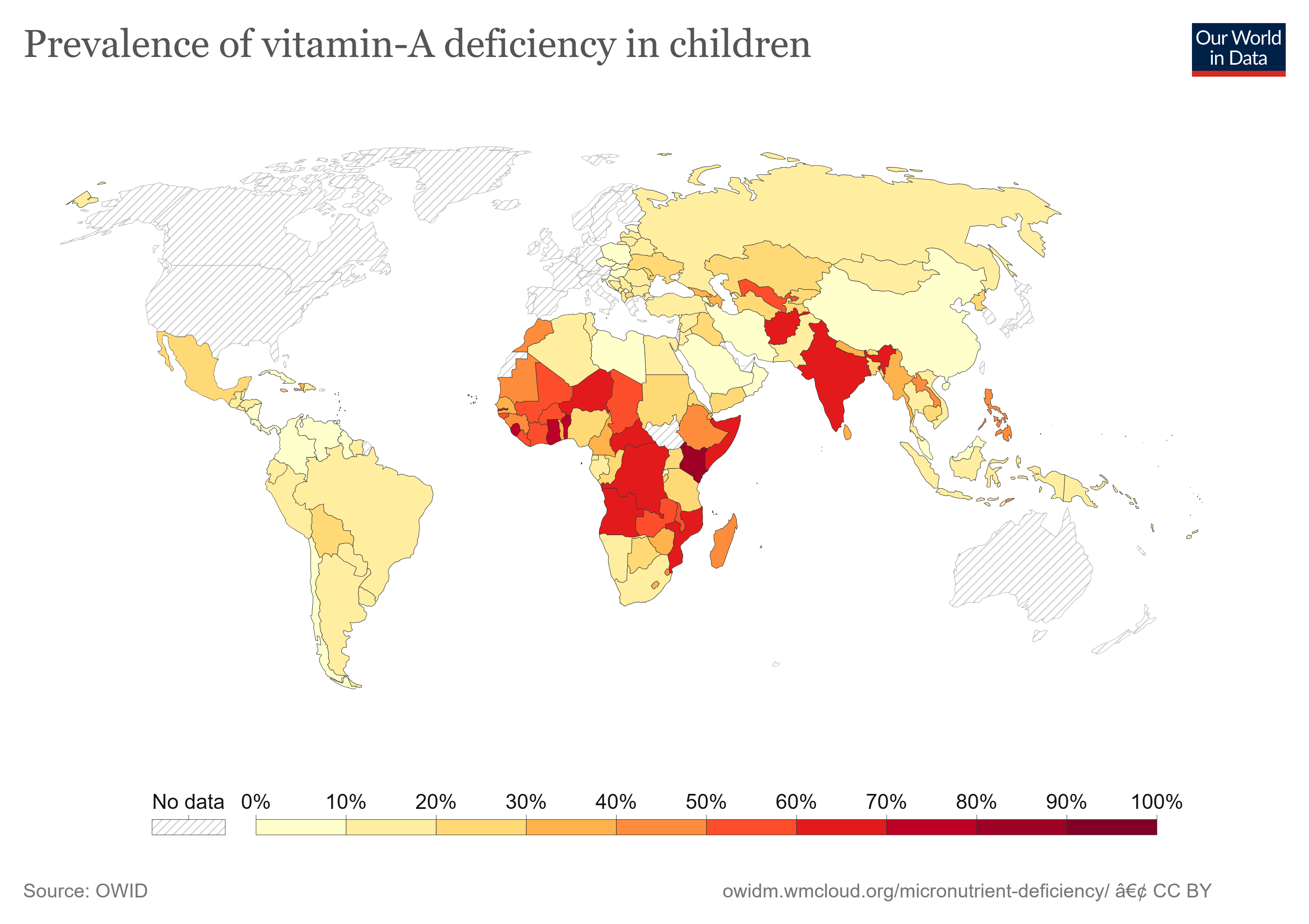
Prevalence of vitamin A deficiency, 1995-2005

Vitamin A deficiency (VAD) or hypovitaminosis A is a lack of vitamin A in blood and tissues. It is common in poorer countries, especially among children and women of reproductive age, but is rarely seen in more developed countries. Vitamin A plays a major role in phototransduction, so this deficiency impairs vision, often presenting with nyctalopia (night blindness). In more severe VAD cases, it can progress to xerophthalmia, keratomalacia, and complete blindness.

Vitamin A deficiency is the leading cause of preventable childhood blindness worldwide and is a major cause of childhood mortality. Each year, approximately 250,000 to 500,000 malnourished children in the developing world go blind from a VAD, with about half of whom dying within a year of losing their sight. Addressing VAD has been a critical focus of global health initiatives, including Sustainable Development Goal 2: to end hunger, achieve food security and improved nutrition and promote sustainable agriculture.

In pregnant women, VAD is associated with a high prevalence of night blindness and poor maternal health outcomes including an increased risk of maternal mortality and complications during pregnancy and lactation. VAD also affects the immune system and diminishes the body's ability to fight infections. In countries where children are not immunized, VAD is linked to higher fatality rates from infectious diseases such as measles. Even mild, subclinical deficiency can also be a problem, as it may increase children's risk of developing respiratory and diarrheal infections, decrease growth, impair bone development, and reduce their likelihood of surviving serious illnesses.

Globally, VAD is estimated to affect about one-third of children under the age of five, causing an estimated 670,000 deaths in children under five annually. It is most prevalent in sub-Saharan Africa (48 percent) and South Asia (44 percent). Although VAD is well-managed in many high income nations, it remains a significant concern in resource-poor settings. Public health interventions, such as vitamin A supplementation, reached 59% of targeted children in 2022, highlighting the ongoing need for comprehensive efforts to combat VAD.

== Signs and symptoms ==
Vitamin A deficiency is the most common cause of blindness in developing countries. The WHO estimated in 1995 that 13.8 million children had some degree of visual loss related to VAD. Night blindness and its worsened condition, xerophthalmia, are markers of Vitamin A deficiency; collections of keratin in the conjunctiva, known as Bitot's spots, and ulceration and necrosis of cornea keratomalacia can be seen. Conjunctival epithelial defects occur around lateral aspect of the limbus in the subclinical stage of VAD. These conjunctival epithelial defects are not visible on a biomicroscope, but they take up black stain and become readily visible after instillation of kajal (surma); this is called "Imtiaz's sign".

=== Night blindness ===
A process called dark adaptation typically causes an increase in photopigment amounts in response to low levels of illumination. This occurs to an enormous magnitude, increasing light sensitivity by up to 100,000 times its sensitivity in normal daylight conditions. VAD affects vision by inhibiting the production of rhodopsin, the photopigment responsible for sensing low-light situations. Rhodopsin is found in the retina and is composed of retinal (an active form of vitamin A) and opsin (a protein).

Night blindness caused by VAD has been associated with the loss of goblet cells in the conjunctiva, a membrane covering the outer surface of the eye. Goblet cells are responsible for secretion of mucus, and their absence results in xerophthalmia, a condition where the eyes fail to produce tears. Dead epithelial and microbial cells accumulate on the conjunctiva and form debris that can lead to infection and possibly blindness.

Decreasing night blindness requires the improvement of vitamin A status in at-risk populations. Supplements and fortification of food have been shown to be effective interventions. Supplement treatment for night blindness includes massive doses of vitamin A (200,000 IU) in the form of retinyl palmitate to be taken by mouth, which is administered two to four times a year. Intramuscular injections are poorly absorbed and are ineffective in delivering sufficient bioavailable vitamin A. Fortification of food with vitamin A is costly, but can be done in wheat, sugar, and milk. Households may circumvent expensive fortified food by altering dietary habits. Consumption of yellow-orange fruits and vegetables rich in carotenoids, specifically beta-carotene, provides provitamin A precursors that can prevent VAD-related night blindness. However, the conversion of carotene to retinol varies from person to person and bioavailability of carotene in food varies.

=== Infection ===
Along with poor diet, infection and disease are common in many developing communities. Infection depletes vitamin A reserves which in turn make the affected individual more susceptible to further infection. Increased incidence of xerophthalmia has been observed after an outbreak of measles, with mortality correlated with severity of eye disease. In longitudinal studies of preschool children, susceptibility to disease increased substantially when severe VAD was present. While VAD can make measles worse, Vitamin A supplements do not prevent measles, high doses may be dangerous, and vaccines remain the most effective way to prevent the disease.

The reason for the increased infection rate in vitamin A deficient individuals is that killer T-cells require the retinol metabolite retinoic acid to proliferate correctly. Retinoic acid is a ligand for nuclear retinoic acid receptors that bind the promoter regions of specific genes, thus activating transcription and stimulating T cell replication. Vitamin A deficiency will often entail deficient retinol intake, resulting in a reduced number of T-cells and lymphocytes, leading to an inadequate immune response and consequently a greater susceptibility to infections. In the presence of dietary deficiency of vitamin A, VAD and infections reciprocally aggravate each other.

== Causes ==
In addition to dietary problems, other causes of VAD are known. Iron deficiency can affect vitamin A uptake. Other causes include conditions that affect intestinal absorption of vitamin A, including fibrosis, pancreatic insufficiency (including alcoholic pancreatitis), inflammatory bowel disease, and small-bowel bypass surgery. These patients represent a majority of cases of vitamin A deficiency in economically developed nations, but not in developing nations. Protein energy malnutrition is often seen in VAD. This is because suppressed synthesis of retinol binding protein (RBP) due to protein deficiency leads to reduced retinol uptake.

In addition to its effects on the pancreas which can cause malabsorption, alcohol can cause a form of vitamin A deficiency localized to the human eye. Retinol requires retinol dehydrogenase to be converted to retinaldehyde; retinol dehydrogenase is the same enzyme as alcohol dehydrogenase. In people with chronic alcohol abuse, alcohol may compete with retinol for this enzyme, depriving the eye of the active form of retinol.

Certain medications are known to decrease intestinal absorption of vitamin A and may cause or contribute to a deficiency. These medications include the antibiotic neomycin, bile acid sequestrants, and mineral oil.

== Diagnosis ==
Initial assessment may be made based on clinical signs of VAD. The most common sign of VAD is night blindness, but VAD might also present with conjunctival xerosis, Bitot spots (foamy lesions), corneal xerosis, or corneal ulcerations.

A VAD deficiency diagnosis is confirmed with laboratory findings. Several methods of assessing bodily vitamin A levels are available, with plasma retinol levels being the most common method of assessing VAD in individuals. A plasma or serum retinol level below 0.70 μmol/L suggests subclinical vitamin A deficiency in both children and adults, while a level below 0.35 μmol/L indicates a severe deficiency of vitamin A.

Other biochemical assessments include measuring serum retinol levels, serum zinc, plasma retinol ester levels, plasma and urinary retonioic acid levels, and vitamin A in breast milk. While liver biopsies are regarded as the gold standard for assessing total body vitamin A, they are rarely used outside of research settings because of the risks associated with the procedure. Additionally, conjunctival impression cytology can be used to assess the presence of xerophthalmia which is strongly correlated with VAD status (and can be used to monitor recovery progress).

== Vitamin A sources ==
Food	μg RAE (2001) per 100 g
cod liver oil	30,000
beef liver (cooked)	4,970–21,145
chicken liver (cooked)	4,296
Sweet potato, baked, no added fat	957
Carrot, frozen, cooked, no added fat	843
Pumpkin, canned, cooked	767
butter (stick)	684
Spinach, fresh, cooked, no added fat	341
cheddar cheese	316
Kale, fresh, cooked, no added fat	245
egg (cooked)	140

Vitamin A is found in many foods. Vitamin A in food exists either as preformed retinol – an active form of vitamin A – found in animal liver, dairy and egg products, and some fortified foods, or as provitamin A carotenoids, which are plant pigments digested into vitamin A after consuming carotenoid-rich plant foods, typically in red, orange, or yellow colors. Carotenoid pigments may be masked by chlorophylls in dark green leaf vegetables, such as spinach. The relatively low bioavailability of plant-food carotenoids results partly from binding to proteins – chopping, homogenizing or cooking disrupts the plant proteins, increasing provitamin A carotenoid bioavailability.

Vegetarian and vegan diets can provide sufficient vitamin A in the form of provitamin A carotenoids if the diet contains carrots, carrot juice, sweet potatoes, green leafy vegetables such as spinach and kale, and other carotenoid-rich foods. In the U.S., the average daily intake of β-carotene is in the range 2–7 mg.

Some manufactured foods and dietary supplements are sources of vitamin A or β-carotene.

== Prevention and treatment ==
Treatment of VAD can be undertaken with both oral vitamin A and injectable forms, generally as vitamin A palmitate.

- High dose vitamin A supplementation has been proven to be an effective and cost effective treatment. Current World Health Organization guidance recommends biannual vitamin A supplementation for children aged 6 to 59 months in areas with high levels of retinol deficiency. Children aged 6-12 months should receive a dose of 100,000 IU and children aged 1-5 years should receive a dose of 200,000 IU each time. This significantly reduces the risk of morbidity, especially from severe diarrhea, and reduces mortality from measles and all-cause mortality. Vitamin A supplementation of children under five who are at risk of VAD has been found to reduce all‐cause mortality by 12 to 24%.
- Side effects of vitamin A supplements are rare. Vitamin A toxicity is a rare concern associated with high levels of vitamin A over prolonged periods of time. Symptoms may include nausea, vomiting, headache, dizziness, irritability, blurred vision, and a lack of muscle coordination. However, when administered in the correct dose, vitamin A is generally safe and effective.
- The World Health Organization also recommends vitamin A supplementation during pregnancy and lactation in areas where VAD is prevalent. Maternal high supplementation benefits both mother and breast-fed infant: high-dose vitamin A supplementation of the lactating mother in the first month postpartum can provide the breast-fed infant with an appropriate amount of vitamin A through breast milk. It also reduces the risk of infection, night blindness, and anemia in the mother. However, vitamin A supplementation in developed countries and high-dose supplementation of pregnant women should be avoided because it can cause miscarriage and birth defects.

Although synthetic vitamin A supplementation is a useful and effective treatment for VAD, a 2017 review (updated in 2022) reported that synthetic vitamin A supplementation may not be the best long‐term solution for vitamin A deficiency, but rather food fortification, improved food distribution programs, and crop improvement, such as for fortified rice or vitamin A-rich sweet potato, may be more effective in eradicating vitamin A deficiency.

- Food fortification is also useful for improving VAD. A variety of oily and dry forms of the retinol esters, retinyl acetates, and retinyl palmitate are available for food fortification of vitamin A. Margarine and oil are the ideal food vehicles for vitamin A fortification. They protect vitamin A from oxidation during storage and prompt absorption of vitamin A. Beta-carotene and retinyl acetate or retinyl palmitate are used as a form of vitamin A for vitamin A fortification of fat-based foods. Fortification of sugar with retinyl palmitate as a form of vitamin A has been used extensively throughout Central America. Cereal flours, milk powder, and liquid milk are also used as food vehicles for vitamin A fortification.
- In addition to adding synthetic vitamin A to foods, researchers have explored fortifying foods such as rice and corn through genetic engineering.
  - Research on rice began in 1982, and the first field trials of golden rice cultivars were conducted in 2004. The result was "Golden Rice", a variety of Oryza sativa rice produced through genetic engineering to biosynthesize beta-carotene, a precursor of retinol, in the edible parts of rice. In May 2018, regulatory agencies in the United States, Canada, Australia and New Zealand concluded that Golden Rice met food safety standards. On 21 July 2021, the Philippines became the first country to officially issue the biosafety permit for commercially propagating Golden Rice. In 2023, however, the Supreme Court of the Philippines ordered the agriculture department to stop commercial propagation of golden rice in relation to a petition filed by MASIPAG (a group of farmers and scientists), who claimed that golden rice poses risk to the health of consumers and to the environment.
  - Researchers at the U.S. Agricultural Research Service have been able to identify genetic sequences in corn that are associated with higher levels of beta-carotene, the precursor to vitamin A. They found that breeders can cross certain variations of corn to produce a crop with an 18-fold increase in beta-carotene.
- Dietary diversification can also reduce risk of VAD. Non-animal sources of vitamin A like fruits and vegetables contain pro-vitamin A and account for greater than 80% of intake for most individuals in the developing world. The increase in consumption of vitamin A-rich foods of animal origin such as liver, milk, cheese, or eggs, also has beneficial effects on VAD.

== Public health initiatives ==
Some countries where VAD is a public-health problem address its elimination by including vitamin A supplements available in capsule form with national immunization days (NIDs) for polio eradication or measles. When the correct dosage is given, vitamin A is safe and has no negative effect on seroconversion rates for oral polio or measles vaccines. Additionally, the delivery of vitamin A supplements, during integrated child health events such as child health days, has helped ensure high coverage of vitamin A supplementation in a large number of least developed countries. Child health events enable many countries in West and Central Africa to achieve over 80% coverage of vitamin A supplementation. According to UNICEF data, in 2013 worldwide, 65% of children between the ages of 6 and 59 months were fully protected with two high-dose vitamin A supplements.Since NIDs provide only one dose per year, NIDs-linked vitamin A distribution must be complemented by other programs to maintain vitamin A in children.

Global efforts to support national governments in addressing VAD are led by the Global Alliance for Vitamin A (GAVA), which is an informal partnership between Nutrition International, Helen Keller International, UNICEF, WHO, and CDC. About 75% of the vitamin A required for supplementation of preschool-aged children in low- and middle-income countries is supplied through a partnership between Nutrition International and UNICEF, with support from Global Affairs Canada. An estimated 1.25 million deaths due to vitamin A deficiency have been averted in 40 countries since 1998.
