= Retinol dehydrogenase =

Class of enzymes

Identifiers
- EC no.: 1.1.1.105
- CAS no.: 9033-53-8

Databases
- IntEnz: IntEnz view
- BRENDA: BRENDA entry
- ExPASy: NiceZyme view
- KEGG: KEGG entry
- MetaCyc: metabolic pathway
- PRIAM: profile
- PDB structures: RCSB PDB PDBe PDBsum
- Gene Ontology: AmiGO / QuickGO
Search
- PMC: articles
- PubMed: articles
- NCBI: proteins

In enzymology, retinol dehydrogenase (RDH) (EC 1.1.1.105) is an enzyme that catalyzes the chemical reaction:

all-trans retinol
+ NAD^{+}
H^{+}
H^{+}
retinal
+ NADH

Sometimes, in addition to or along with NAD^{+}, NADP^{+} can act as an alternative cofactor in the reaction. The substrate of the enzyme can be all-trans- or -cis- retinol. Some 20 enzymes with RDH activity had been found and studied by 2006. The two substrates of this enzyme are retinol and oxidised nicotinamide adenine dinucleotide (NAD^{+}). Its products are retinal, reduced NADH, and a proton.

This enzyme belongs to the family of oxidoreductases, specifically those acting on the CH-OH group of donor with NAD^{+} or NADP^{+} as acceptor. The systematic name of this enzyme class is retinol:NAD^{+} oxidoreductase. Other names in common use include retinol (vitamin A1) dehydrogenase, MDR, microsomal retinol dehydrogenase, all-trans retinol dehydrogenase, retinal reductase, and retinene reductase. This enzyme participates in retinol metabolism. Occasionally, the literature refers to retinol dehydrogenase as an enzyme that oxidizes retinol in general, such as class IV alcohol dehydrogenase (ADH4), which reportedly is the most efficient retinol oxidation in the human alcohol dehydrogenase (ADH) family.

== Structure ==
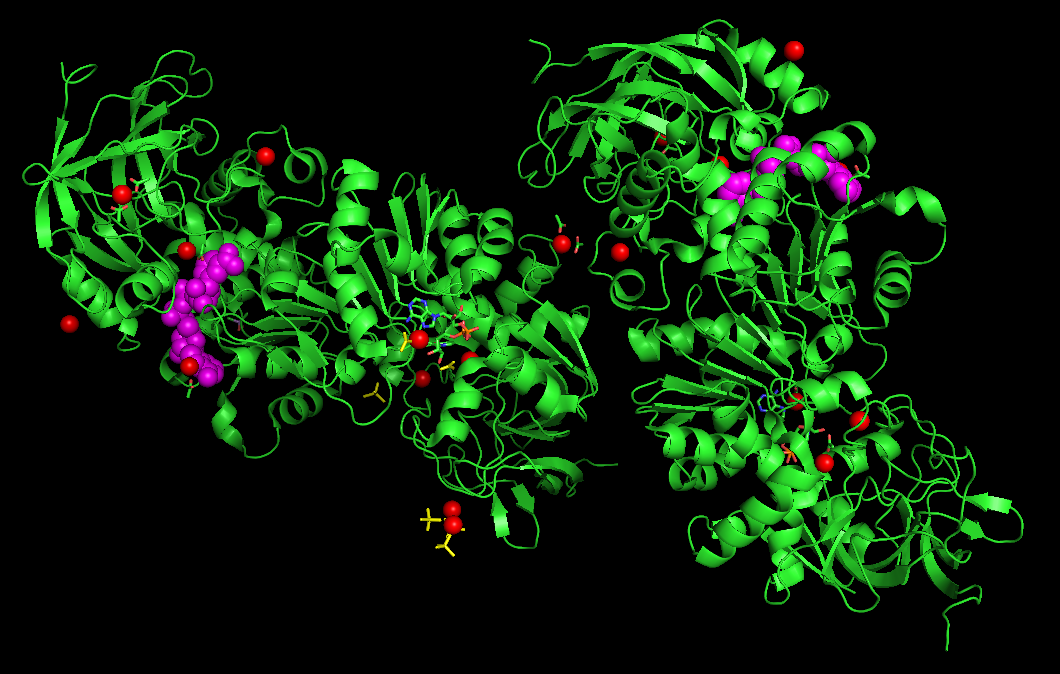
Image 1: Wild-type human sigma (class IV) alcohol dehydrogenase (1D1S) has retinol dehydrogenase activity. Zinc molecules are depicted as red balls, while NAD molecules are purple. Note that the enzyme exists as two protein units in this figure. (PDB file from RCSB)

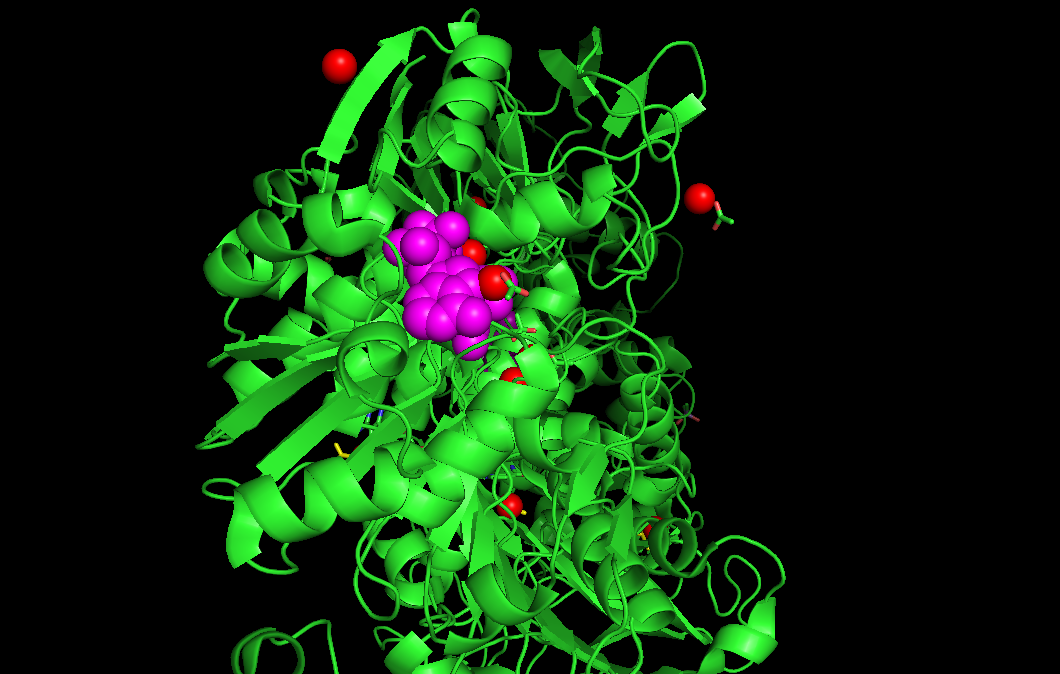
Image 2: Wild-type human sigma (class IV) alcohol dehydrogenase (1D1S). Retinols will bind between the catalytic zinc molecules (red balls) and the NAD molecule (purple). (PDB file from RCSB)

As one of the most important RDH, 11-cis-retinol dehydrogenase catalyzes the 11-cis retinaldehyde (the most common visual pigments in higher animals) formation. The enzyme is mainly expressed in the retinal pigment epithelium (RPE) and is part of short-chain dehydrogenase (SDR) / reductase superfamily. The integral membrane enzyme is anchored to the membranes by its two hydrophobic chains. The catalytic domain of 11-cis-retinol dehydrogenase is restricted to the lumenal compartment, suggesting its origin from compartmentalized process. 11-cis-retinol dehydrogenase is also mainly associated to the smooth endoplasmic reticulum of RPE cells. The 32-kDa integral membrane protein protein (p32) was found to act as the stereospecific 11-cis-retinol dehydrogenase in the presence of NAD^{+} cofactor, and p32 catalyzes the biosynthesis of 11-cis retinal commonly found visual chromophore.

One of the widely studied genes of retinol dehydrogenase RDH12, which encodes retinol dehydrogenase is part of the superfamily of short-chained alcohol dehydrogenases and reductases. RDH12 is mainly expressed in neuroretina and is composed of 7 exons encoding a 360-amino acid peptide.

Zinc molecules serve as the ligand cofactor with the cofactor NAD. The retinol will interact with the enzyme at the area between those two cofactors.

However, not all retinol dehydrogenases in visual cycle are identified, and this remains challenging to scientists due to the overlapping expressions and activity redundancy among two large RDH and RDH-like producing classes: microsomal short-chain dehydrogenase/reductase and cytosolic medium-chain alcohol dehydrogenases.

In Bovine, retinol dehydrogenase is found as a part of retinal rod outer segments and shows difficulty when separating from membrane. Its Stokes radius is 8.5 nm in Lubrol 12A9 mixed micelle.

== Function ==
Retinoid dehydrogenases/reductases (oxidoreductases), including retinol dehydrogenase, catalyze the key oxidation-reduction reactions in the visual cycle, converting vitamin A to 11-cis retinal, which is the chromophore of the rod and cone photoreceptors. It is believed that RDHs at rod and cone are different, but related and can catalyze the same reaction. RDH12 is the primary enzyme that reduces all-trans retinal released from bleached photopigments during recovery phase in the visual cycle. The RDH12 enzyme can use either cis or trans retinoid isomers as substrates and can also function as both dehydrogenase (i.e. retinol to retinal) and reductase (i.e. retinal to retinol).

The conversion of retinol to retinal is the rate-limiting step in the retinoic acid biosynthesis. In vertebrates, the retinoic acid is the ligand that controls nuclear receptor signaling pathway, which is responsible for growth and development as well as epithelial maintenance, therefore can be used for cancer and acne treatment. In human, ADH4 can exhibit at least 10 folds higher V_{max}/K_{m} than other ADH.

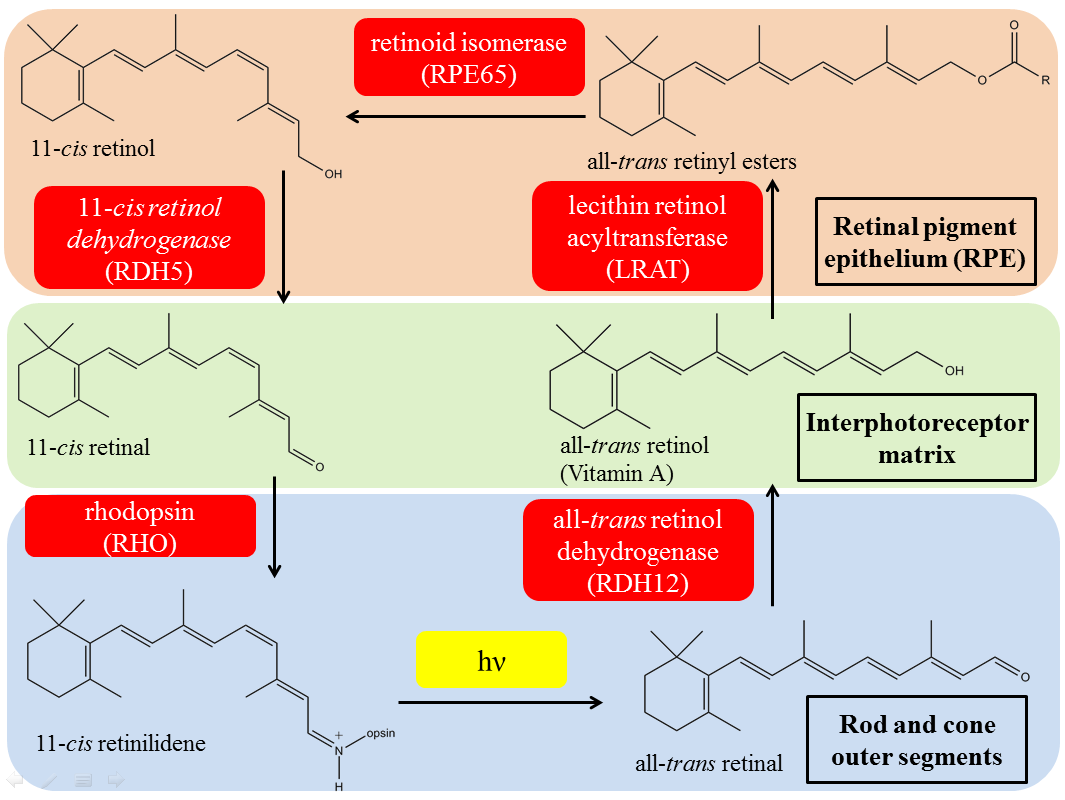
Image 3: The visual phototransduction cycle yields 11-cis-retinal from 11-cis-retinol using 11-cis-retinol dehydrogenase.

Some retinol dehydrogenases are in extra-ocular tissues, such as human retinol dehydrogenase-4 (RoDH-4), which converts retinol and 1-cis-retinol to different aldehydes in liver and skin. It was also found that 13-cis-retinoic acid (isotretinoin), 3,4-didehydroretinoic acid, and 3,4-didehydroretinol can act as competitive inhibitor of the 3α-hydroxysteroid dehydrogenase oxidative activity of the enzyme. This can potentially explain how isotretinoin, the active ingredient is Roaccutane (Accutane), can suppress sebaceous glands and be used for severe acne treatment.

== Disease relevance ==
The missense mutation in gene rdh5, which codes for microsomal 11-cis-retinol dehydrogenase (RDH5), causes fundus albipunctatus, whose symptoms include retinal white-spot accumulation, stationary night blindness caused by delay in cone and rod photopigment regeneration, and elderly cone dystrophy.

At least 20 mutations in rdh12 gene, which encodes retinol dehydrogenase, can be associated to diseases, including severe and early-onset autosomal recessive retinal dystrophy (arRD), or Leber congenital amaurosis. Patients suffer from cone and rod malfunction since childhood and develop legal blindness when reaching adulthood. This suggests that RDH12 might play a central role in the visual cycle and can be a promising therapeutic target. A possible mechanism of the accelerated degradation among RDH12 mutants is the polyubiquitination by cytosolic ubiquitin ligases and subsequent degradation by proteosome. Its conformation aberration provokes the aforementioned accelerated degradation.
