= Xerophthalmia =

Dry eye

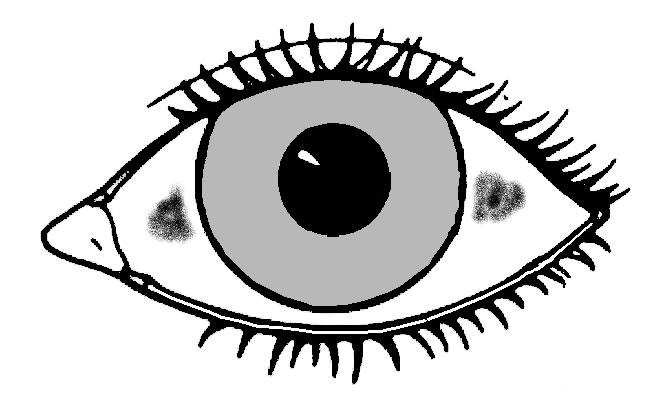
- In xerophthalmia, Bitot's spots occur after conjunctival xerosis.
- Pronunciation: /ˌzɪərɒfˈθælmiə/
- Specialty: Ophthalmology
- Symptoms: Night blindness
- Complications: Blindness due to corneal opacity
- Causes: Vitamin A deficiency (main)

Xerophthalmia (from Ancient Greek xērós (ξηρός) meaning "dry" and ophthalmos (οφθαλμός) meaning "eye") is a medical condition in which the eye fails to produce tears. It may be caused by vitamin A deficiency, which is sometimes used to describe that condition, although there may be other causes.

Xerophthalmia caused by a severe vitamin A deficiency is described by pathologic dryness of the conjunctiva and cornea. The conjunctiva becomes dry, thick and wrinkled. The first symptom is poor vision at night. If untreated, xerophthalmia can lead to dry eye syndrome, corneal ulceration, and ultimately to blindness as a result of corneal and retinal damage.

Xerophthalmia usually implies a destructive dryness of the conjunctival epithelium due to dietary vitamin A deficiency—a rare condition in developed countries, but still causing much damage in developing countries. Other forms of dry eye are associated with aging, poor lid closure, scarring from a previous injury, or autoimmune diseases such as rheumatoid arthritis and Sjögren's syndrome, and these can all cause chronic conjunctivitis. Radioiodine therapy can also induce xerophthalmia, often transiently, although in some patients late onset or persistent xerophthalmia has been observed.

The damage to the cornea in vitamin A associated xerophthalmia is quite different from damage to the retina at the back of the globe, a type of damage which can also be due to lack of vitamin A, but which is caused by lack of other forms of vitamin A which work in the visual system. Xerophthalmia from hypovitaminosis A is specifically due to lack of the hormone-like vitamin A metabolite retinoic acid, since (along with certain growth-stunting effects) the condition can be reversed in vitamin A deficient rats by retinoic acid supplementation (however the retinal damage continues). Since retinoic acid cannot be reduced to retinal or retinol, these effects on the cornea must be specific to retinoic acid. This is in keeping with retinoic acid's known requirement for good health in epithelial cells, such as those in the cornea.

== Classification ==
The World Health Organization classifies xerophthalmia into the following stages:

- XN-Night blindness
- X1A-Conjunctival xerosis
- X1B-Bitot spots
- X2-Corneal xerosis
- X3A-Corneal ulceration/keratomalacia, involving less than one-third of the cornea
- X3B-Corneal ulceration/keratomalacia, involving more than one-third of the cornea
- XS-Corneal scar due to xerophthalmia
- XF-Xerophthalmic fundus

== Cause ==
The condition is not congenital and develops over the course of a few months as the lacrimal glands fail to produce tears. Other conditions involved in the progression already stated include the appearance of Bitot's spots, which are clumps of keratin debris that build up inside the conjunctiva and night blindness, which precedes corneal ulceration and total blindness.

== Prevention ==
Prophylaxis consists of periodic administration of vitamin A supplements. The WHO recommended schedule is as follows:

- Infants 6–12 months old and any older children weighing less than 8 kg – 100,000 IU orally every 3–6 months
- Children over 1 year and under 6 years of age – 200,000 IU orally every 6 months
- Infants less than 6 months old, who are not being breastfed – 50,000 IU orally should be given before they attain the age of 6 months

== Treatment ==
Treatment can occur in two ways: treating symptoms and treating the deficiency. Treatment of symptoms usually includes the use of artificial tears in the form of eye drops, increasing the humidity of the environment with humidifiers, and wearing wraparound glasses when outdoors. Treatment of the deficiency can be accomplished with a vitamin A or multivitamin supplement or by eating foods rich in vitamin A. Treatment with supplements and/or diet can be successful until the disease progresses as far as corneal ulceration, at which point only an extreme surgery can offer a chance of returning sight.

== Epidemiology ==
Throughout southeast Asia, estimates are that more than half of children under the age of six years have subclinical vitamin A deficiency and night blindness, with progression to xerophthalmia being the leading cause of preventable childhood blindness. Estimates are that each year there are 350,000 cases of childhood blindness due to vitamin A deficiency. The causes are vitamin A deficiency during pregnancy, followed by low transfer of vitamin A during lactation and infant/child diets low in vitamin A or beta-carotene. The prevalence of pre-school age children who are blind due to vitamin A deficiency is lower than expected from incidence of new cases only because childhood vitamin A deficiency significantly increases all-cause mortality.

== See also ==
- Keratoconjunctivitis
- Keratoconjunctivitis sicca
- Keratomalacia, also caused by vitamin A deficiency.
