= 11-cis-retinol dehydrogenase =

Class of enzymes

Identifiers
- EC no.: 1.1.1.315

Databases
- BRENDA: enzyme data
- ExPASy: NiceZyme view
- KEGG: enzyme entry
- MetaCyc: metabolic pathway
- Rhea: reactions
- PDB structures: RCSB PDB PDBe PDBsum
Search
- PMC: articles
- PubMed: articles
- NCBI: proteins

11-cis-retinol dehydrogenase (EC 1.1.1.315, RDH5 (gene)) is an enzyme with systematic name 11-cis-retinol:NAD^{+} oxidoreductase. This enzyme catalyses the following chemical reaction

11-cis-retinol---[retinal-binding-protein] + NAD^{+} $\rightleftharpoons$ 11-cis-retinal---[retinol-binding-protein] + NADH + H^{+}

11-cis-retinol

This enzyme from retinal pigment epithelium, catalyses the reduction of 11-cis-retinol to 11-cis-retinal.
