= Lecithin retinol acyltransferase =

Mammalian protein found in Homo sapiens

LRAT
Available structures
PDB	Ortholog search: PDBe RCSB
PDB	List of PDB id codes 4Q95

Identifiers
- Aliases: LRAT, LCA14, lecithin retinol acyltransferase (phosphatidylcholine--retinol O-acyltransferase), lecithin retinol acyltransferase
- External IDs: OMIM: 604863; MGI: 1891259; HomoloGene: 3483; GeneCards: LRAT; OMA:LRAT - orthologs

Gene location (Human)
Chr.	Chromosome 4 (human)
Band	4q32.1	Start	154,626,945 bp
Band	4q32.1	End	154,753,120 bp

Gene location (Mouse)
Chr.	Chromosome 3 (mouse)
Band	3|3 E3	Start	82,799,886 bp
Band	3|3 E3	End	82,811,280 bp
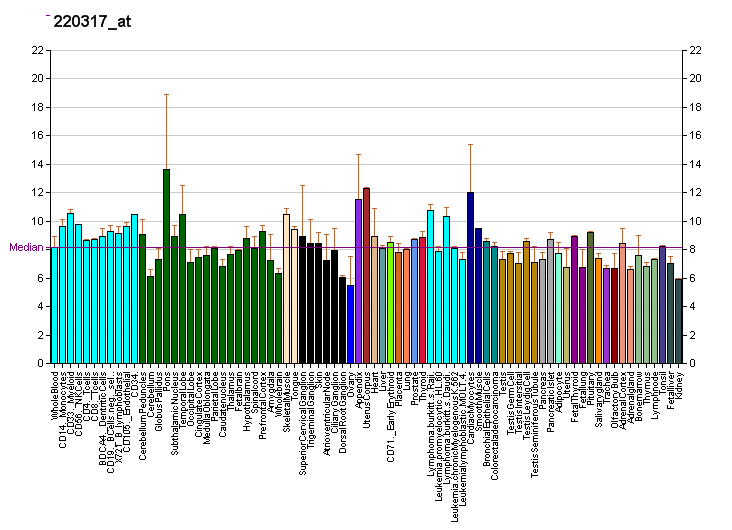
RNA expression pattern
Bgee	Human / Mouse (ortholog); Top expressed in: retinal pigment epithelium; testicle; gonad; gallbladder; jejunal mucosa; C1 segment; duodenum; right lobe of liver; muscle layer of sigmoid colon; tibial nerve / Top expressed in: retinal pigment epithelium; median eminence; arcuate nucleus; epithelium of small intestine; right lung; right lung lobe; Paneth cell; ciliary body; duodenum; migratory enteric neural crest cell; More reference expression data
BioGPS	More reference expression data
Gene ontology
Molecular function	acyltransferase activity; retinol binding; O-acyltransferase activity; transferase activity; retinoic acid binding; lecithin:11-cis retinol acyltransferase activity; O-palmitoyltransferase activity; phosphatidylcholine-retinol O-acyltransferase activity
Cellular component	endoplasmic reticulum; cytoplasm; endosome; integral component of membrane; membrane; intracellular membrane-bounded organelle; endoplasmic reticulum membrane; multivesicular body; rough endoplasmic reticulum; perinuclear region of cytoplasm
Biological process	vitamin A metabolic process; visual perception; retinoid metabolic process; response to stimulus; positive regulation of lipid transport; cellular response to leukemia inhibitory factor; retinol metabolic process; response to retinoic acid; response to vitamin A; response to bacterium
Sources:Amigo / QuickGO
Orthologs
Species	Human	Mouse
Entrez	9227	79235
Ensembl	ENSG00000121207	ENSMUSG00000028003
UniProt	O95237	Q9JI60
RefSeq (mRNA)	NM_001301645; NM_004744	NM_023624
RefSeq (protein)	NP_001288574; NP_004735	NP_076113
Location (UCSC)	Chr 4: 154.63 – 154.75 Mb	Chr 3: 82.8 – 82.81 Mb
PubMed search
- Wikidata
View/Edit Human	View/Edit Mouse

Lecithin retinol acyltransferase is an enzyme that in humans is encoded by the LRAT gene.

== Function ==
Lecithin retinol acyltransferase is a microsomal enzyme that catalyzes the esterification of all-trans-retinol into all-trans-retinyl ester during phototransduction, an essential reaction for the retinoid cycle in visual system and vitamin A status in liver.

== Clinical significance ==
Mutations in this gene have been associated with early-onset severe retinal dystrophy.

LRAT was overexpressed in colorectal cancer cells compared to normal colonic epithelium. Strong LRAT expression was associated with a poor prognosis in patients with colorectal cancer.

== See also ==
- Visual cycle
