= Keratomalacia =

- Specialty: Endocrinology, ophthalmology

Keratomalacia is an eye disorder that results from vitamin A deficiency. Vitamin A is required to maintain specialized epithelia (such as in the cornea and conjunctiva).

The precise mechanism is still not known, but vitamin A is necessary for the maintenance of the specialized epithelial surfaces of the body. A lack of vitamin A leads to atrophic changes in the normal mucosal surface, with loss of goblet cells, and replacement of the normal epithelium by an inappropriate keratinized stratified squamous epithelium. In addition, the substantia propria of the cornea breaks down and liquefies, resulting in keratomalacia.

The resulting cornea becomes totally opaque, which is one of the most common reasons for blindness around the world, particularly in developing countries.

== Figures ==
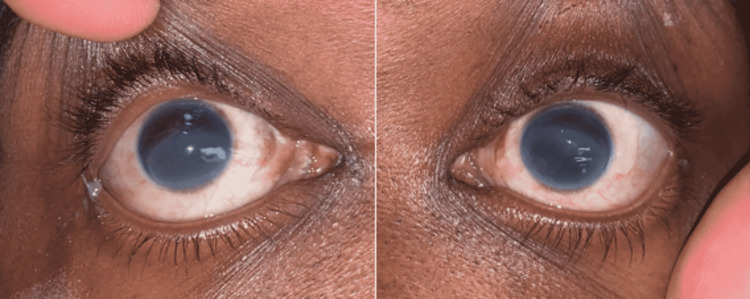
Bilateral keratomalacia in a 32-year old male due to pancreatic insufficiency. From a report by Bijan et al., 2022.

== See also ==
- Acute promyelocytic leukemia
- Keratoconjunctivitis sicca
- Xerophthalmia
