= Nyctalopia =

Condition making it difficult or impossible to see in relatively low light

- Other names: Night blindness
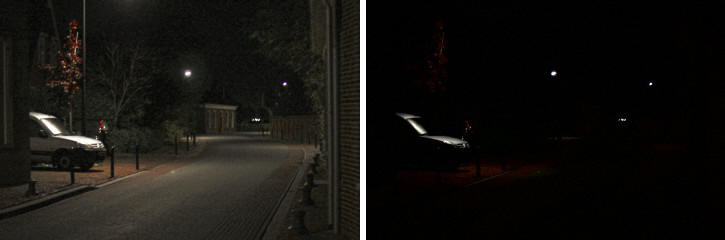
- Effect of night blindness. Left: normal night vision. Right: night-blind vision.
- Specialty: Ophthalmology

Nyctalopia (/ˌnɪktəˈloʊpiə/; from Ancient Greek νύκτ- (núkt-) 'night', ἀλαός (alaós) 'blind, invisible' and ὄψ (óps) 'eye'), also called night blindness, is a condition making it difficult or impossible to see in relatively low light. It is a symptom of several eye diseases. Night blindness may exist from birth, or be caused by injury or malnutrition (for example, vitamin A deficiency). It can be described as insufficient adaptation to darkness.

The most common cause of nyctalopia is retinitis pigmentosa, a disorder in which the rod cells in the retina gradually lose their ability to respond to the light. Patients with this genetic condition have progressive nyctalopia and, eventually, their daytime vision may also be affected. In X-linked congenital stationary night blindness, from birth the rods either do not work at all, or work very little, but the condition does not get worse.

Another cause of night blindness is a deficiency of retinol, or vitamin A_{1}, found in fish oils, liver, and dairy products.

The opposite problem, the inability to see in bright light, is known as hemeralopia and is much rarer.

Since the outer area of the retina is made up of more rods than cones, loss of peripheral vision often results in night blindness. Individuals with night blindness not only see poorly at night but also require extra time for their eyes to adjust from brightly lit areas to dim ones. Contrast vision may also be greatly reduced.

Rods contain a receptor-protein called rhodopsin. When light falls on rhodopsin, it undergoes a series of conformational changes ultimately generating electrical signals which are carried to the brain via the optic nerve. In the absence of light, rhodopsin is regenerated. The body synthesizes rhodopsin from vitamin A, which is why a deficiency in vitamin A causes poor night vision.

Refractive "vision correction" surgery (especially PRK with the complication of "haze") may rarely cause a reduction in best night-time acuity due to the impairment of contrast sensitivity function (CSF) which is induced by intraocular light-scatter resulting from surgical intervention in the natural structural integrity of the cornea.

== Causes ==
- Cataract (peripheral cortical)
- Certain medications, such as phenothiazines
- Choroideremia
- Chronic pancreatitis - Presumably due to malabsorption of vitamin A
- Glaucoma
- Oguchi disease
- Pathological myopia
- Refractive surgery (LASIK, photorefractive keratectomy, radial keratotomy)
- Retinal detachment
- Retinitis pigmentosa
- Sorsby's Fundus Dystrophy (Macular degeneration)
- Visual snow
- Vitamin A deficiency; often via xerophthalmia

== Treatment ==
Phentolamine as an eye drop is under development for the treatment of nyctalopia and is in phase 3 clinical trials for this use.

== Historical usage ==
Aulus Cornelius Celsus, writing ca. 30 AD, described night blindness and recommended an effective dietary supplement, liver being a good source of vitamin A: "There is besides a weakness of the eyes, owing to which people see well enough indeed in the daytime but not at all at night; in women whose menstruation is regular this does not happen. But success sufferers should anoint their eyeballs with the stuff dripping from a liver while roasting, preferably of a he-goat, or failing that of a she-goat; and as well they should eat some of the liver itself."

Historically, nyctalopia, also known as moonblink, was a temporary night blindness believed to be caused by sleeping in moonlight in the tropics.

In the French language, nyctalopie and héméralopie have inverse meanings, the first naming the ability to see in the dark as well as in plain light, and the second the inability to do so. It is thought that this inversion from Latin happened during the 2nd century AD, even though the Ancient Greek νυκτάλωψ (nuktálōps) has been used in both senses.

Night blindness, sometimes referred to as gravel, was occasionally documented during the American Civil War, particularly within the Confederate States of America. Like rheumatism, night blindness was viewed as a condition that could be easily faked or exaggerated and, initially, people with night blindness were regarded with some suspicion. Some soldiers who reported symptoms of nyctalopia also presented with symptoms of scurvy, suggesting a fundamental cause of poor nutrition.

== Nyctalopia in animals ==
Congenital stationary night blindness is also an ophthalmologic disorder in horses with leopard spotting patterns, such as the Appaloosa. It is present at birth (congenital), not sex-linked, non-progressive, and affects the animal's vision in conditions of low lighting. Congenital stationary night blindness (CSNB) is usually diagnosed based on the owner's observations, but some horses have visibly abnormal eyes: poorly aligned eyes (dorsomedial strabismus) or involuntary eye movement (nystagmus). In horses, CSNB has been linked with the leopard complex color pattern since the 1970s. A 2008 study theorizes that both CSNB and leopard complex spotting patterns are linked to the TRPM1 gene. The region on horse chromosome 1 to which the Lp gene has now been localized also encodes a protein that channels calcium ions, a key factor in the transmission of nerve impulses. This protein, found in the retina and the skin, exists in fractional percentages of the normal levels found in homozygous Lp/Lp horses and so compromises the basic chemical reaction for nerve impulse transmission.
