= Retinol =

Chemical compound

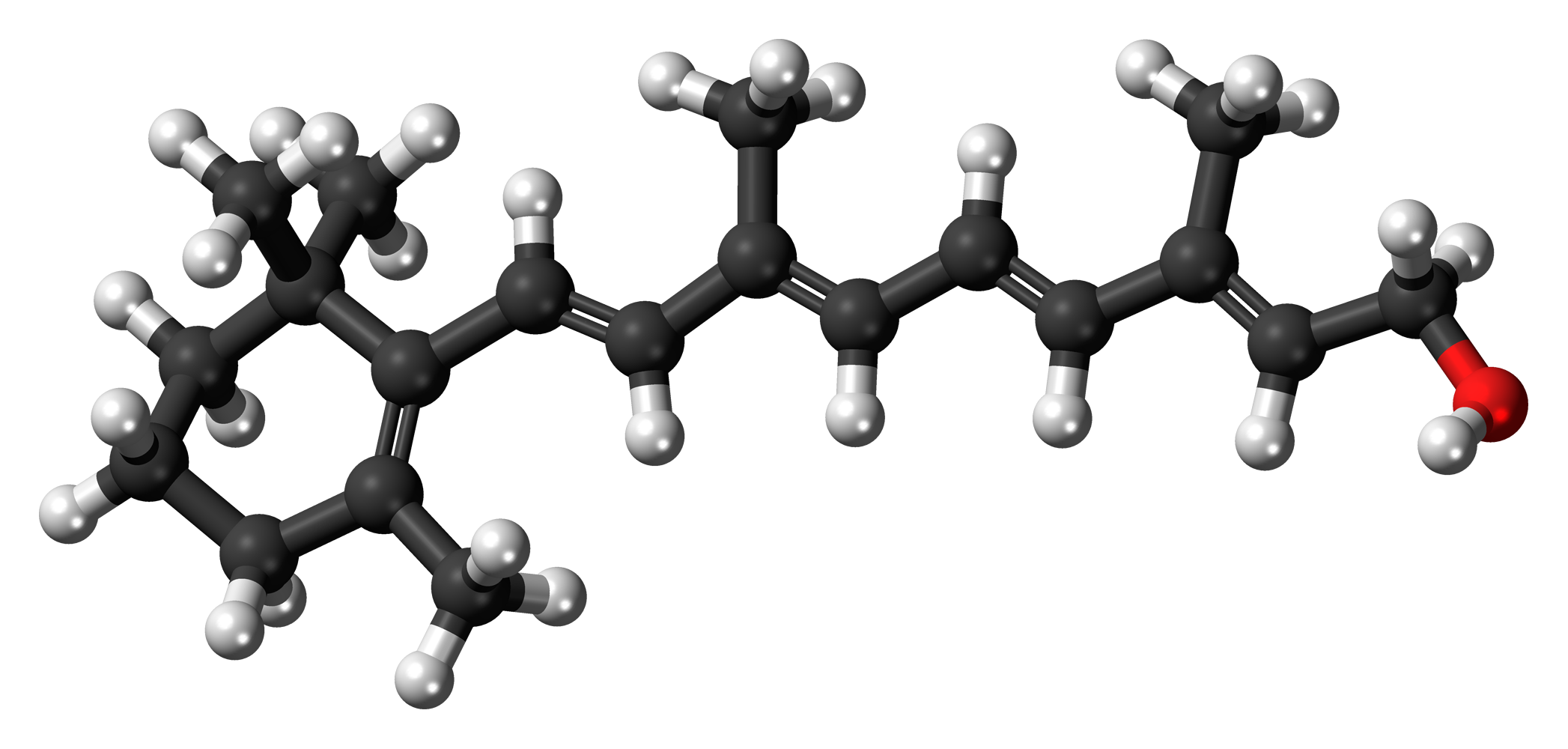
- Retinol

Clinical data
- AHFS/Drugs.com: Monograph
- License data: US DailyMed: Retinol
- Routes of administration: By mouth, intramuscular
- Drug class: vitamin
- ATC code: A11CA01 (WHO) D10AD02 (WHO), R01AX02 (WHO), S01XA02 (WHO)

Legal status
- Legal status: US: OTC

Identifiers
- IUPAC name: (2E,4E,6E,8E)-3,7-dimethyl-9-(2,6,6-trimethylcyclohex-1-en-1-yl)nona-2,4,6,8-tetraen-1-ol
- CAS Number: 68-26-8; mixture: 11103-57-4
- PubChem CID: 445354
- IUPHAR/BPS: 4053
- DrugBank: DB00162
- ChemSpider: 393012
- UNII: G2SH0XKK91; mixture: 81G40H8B0T
- KEGG: D00069
- ChEBI: CHEBI:17336
- ChEMBL: ChEMBL986
- PDB ligand: RTL (PDBe, RCSB PDB)
- CompTox Dashboard (EPA): DTXSID3023556
- ECHA InfoCard: 100.000.621

Chemical and physical data
- Formula: C_{20}H_{30}O
- Molar mass: 286.459 g·mol^{−1}
- 3D model (JSmol): Interactive image
- Density: 0.955 ± 0.06 g/cm^{3}
- Melting point: 62–64 °C (144–147 °F)
- Boiling point: 137–138 °C (279–280 °F) (10^{−6} mm Hg)
- Solubility in water: 0.000017 mg/mL (20 °C)
- SMILES: OC/C=C(C)/C=C/C=C(C)/C=C/C1=C(C)/CCCC1(C)C
- InChI: InChI=1S/C20H30O/c1-16(8-6-9-17(2)13-15-21)11-12-19-18(3)10-7-14-20(19,4)5/h6,8-9,11-13,21H,7,10,14-15H2,1-5H3/b9-6+,12-11+,16-8+,17-13+; Key:FPIPGXGPPPQFEQ-OVSJKPMPSA-N

Retinol is a hydrolytic metabolite of retinyl esters belonging to the group of vitamin A_{1} as an alcohol form. Retinol or other forms of vitamin A are fat-soluble vitamins that are found in food and used as a dietary supplement. Either of them is needed for vision, cellular development, maintenance of skin and mucous membranes, immune function and reproductive development. Dietary sources include fish, dairy products, and meat.

The term vitamin A may refer to several related fat-soluble retinoids. Retinol is the alcohol form of vitamin A; retinal and retinoic acid are metabolites of retinol; and retinyl esters, such as retinyl palmitate and retinyl acetate, are forms used in storage and in some dietary supplements. In European Union cosmetics regulation, the INCI names Retinol, Retinyl Acetate, and Retinyl Palmitate are described as substances collectively known as vitamin A.

As a supplement it is used to treat and prevent vitamin A deficiency, especially that which results in xerophthalmia. It is taken by mouth or by injection into a muscle. As an ingredient in skin-care products, it is used topically (externally) to reduce effects of skin aging, including wrinkles, fine lines, and irregular pigmentation.

Retinol at normal doses is well tolerated. High doses may cause enlargement of the liver, dry skin, and hypervitaminosis A. High doses during pregnancy may harm the fetus. The body converts retinol to retinal and retinoic acid, through which it acts.

Retinol was discovered in 1909, isolated in 1931, and first made in 1947. It is on the World Health Organization's List of Essential Medicines. Retinol is available as a generic medication and is also used in over-the-counter cosmetic products. In 2021, vitamin A was the 298th most commonly prescribed medication in the United States, with more than 500,000 prescriptions.

== Medical uses ==
Retinol is used to treat vitamin A deficiency.

Three approaches may be used when populations have low vitamin A levels:

1. Through dietary modification involving the adjustment of menu choices of affected persons from available food sources to optimize vitamin A content.
2. Enriching commonly eaten and affordable foods with vitamin A, a process called fortification. It involves the addition of synthetic vitamin A to staple foods like margarine, bread, flour, cereals, and infant formula during processing.
3. By giving high doses of vitamin A to the targeted deficient population, a method known as supplementation. In regions where deficiency is common, a single large dose is recommended to those at high risk twice a year.

Retinol is also used to reduce the risk of complications in measles patients.

== Side effects ==
The Recommended Daily Intake (RDA) for preformed supplemental vitamin A for adult men and women is 900 and 700 Retinol Activity Units(RAE)/day, respectively, or about 3,000 IU and 2,300 IU. In pregnancy, the vitamin A RDA is 750–770 RAE/day (about 2,500–2,550 IU). During lactation, the RDA increases to 1,200–1,300 RAE/day (about 4,000–4,300 IU, with differences depending on age).

Retinol Activity Units can only be converted to IU (International Units) when the source of the vitamin A is known. The IU values listed above do not apply to food sources of vitamin A.

Too much vitamin A in retinoid form can be harmful. The body converts the dimerized form, carotene, into vitamin A as it is needed, so high levels of carotene are not toxic, whereas the ester (animal) forms are. The livers of certain animals, especially those adapted to polar environments, such as polar bears and seals, often contain amounts of vitamin A that would be toxic to humans. Thus, vitamin A toxicity is typically reported in Arctic explorers and people taking large doses of synthetic vitamin A. The first documented death possibly caused by vitamin A poisoning was that of Xavier Mertz, a Swiss scientist, who died in January 1913 on an Antarctic expedition that had lost its food supplies and fell to eating its sled dogs. Mertz may have consumed lethal amounts of vitamin A by eating the dogs' livers.

Vitamin A acute toxicity occurs when a person ingests vitamin A in large amounts more than the daily recommended value in the threshold of 25,000 IU/kg or more. Often, the patient consumes about 3–4 times the RDA's specification. Toxicity of vitamin A is believed to be associated with the methods of increasing vitamin A in the body, such as food modification, fortification, and supplementation, all of which are used to combat vitamin A deficiency. Toxicity is classified into two categories: acute and chronic. The former occurs a few hours or days after ingestion of a large amount of vitamin A. Chronic toxicity takes place when about 4,000 IU/kg or more of vitamin A is consumed for a long time. Symptoms of both include nausea, blurred vision, fatigue, weight loss, and menstrual abnormalities.

Excess vitamin A is suspected to be a contributor to osteoporosis. This seems to happen at much lower doses than those required to induce acute intoxication. Only preformed vitamin A can cause these problems because the conversion of carotenoids or retinyl esters into vitamin A is downregulated when physiological requirements are met; but excessive uptake of carotenoids can cause carotenosis.

Excess preformed vitamin A during early pregnancy is associated with a significant increase in birth defects. These defects may be severe, even life-threatening. Even twice the daily recommended amount can cause severe birth defects. The FDA recommends that pregnant women get their vitamin A from foods containing beta carotene and that they ensure that they consume no more than 5,000 IU of preformed vitamin A (if any) per day. Although vitamin A is necessary for fetal development, most women carry sufficient stores of vitamin A in their liver cells, so over-supplementation should be strictly avoided.

A review of all randomized controlled trials in the scientific literature by the Cochrane Collaboration published in JAMA in 2007 found that supplementation with beta carotene or vitamin A increased mortality by 5% and 16%, respectively. This effect has been attributed to the role of retinol and retinoic acid in increasing circulating cholesterol and triglycerides as well as promoting cancer incidence.

Studies emerging from developing countries India, Bangladesh, and Indonesia strongly suggest that, in populations in which vitamin A deficiency is common and maternal mortality is high, dosing expectant mothers with retinol can greatly reduce maternal mortality. Similarly, dosing newborn infants with 50,000 IU (15 mg) of vitamin A within two days of birth can significantly reduce neonatal mortality.

== Biological roles ==
Retinol or other forms of vitamin A are needed for eyesight, maintenance of the skin, and human development. Other than for vision, which requires 11-cis retinal, the active compound is retinoic acid, synthesized from retinal, in turn synthesized from retinol. The differing biological roles of retinoic acid depend on its stereochemistry and whether it is present in the all-trans, 9-cis, or 13-cis forms.

=== Embryology ===
Retinoic acid via the retinoic acid receptor influences the process of cell differentiation and, hence, the growth and development of embryos. During development, there is a concentration gradient of retinoic acid along the anterior-posterior (head-tail) axis. Cells in the embryo respond to retinoic acid differently depending on the amount present. For example, in vertebrates, the hindbrain transiently forms eight rhombomeres and each rhombomere has a specific pattern of genes being expressed. If retinoic acid is not present the last four rhombomeres do not develop. Instead, rhombomeres 1–4 grow to cover the same amount of space as all eight would normally occupy. Retinoic acid has its effects by turning on a differential pattern of Homeobox (Hox) genes that encode different homeodomain transcription factors which in turn can turn on cell type-specific genes. Deletion of the Homeobox (Hox-1) gene from rhombomere 4 makes the neurons growing in that region behave like neurons from rhombomere 2. Retinoic acid is not required for patterning of the retina as originally proposed, but retinoic acid synthesized in the retina is secreted into the surrounding mesenchyme where it is required to prevent overgrowth of perioptic mesenchyme which can cause microphthalmia, defects in the cornea and eyelid, and rotation of the optic cup.

=== Stem cell biology ===
Synthetic retinoic acid is used in differentiation of stem cells to more committed fates, echoing retinoic acid's importance in natural embryonic developmental pathways. It is thought to initiate differentiation into several different cell lineages through activation of the Retinoic acid receptor. It has numerous applications in the experimental induction of stem cell differentiation; amongst these is the differentiation of human embryonic stem cells to posterior foregut lineages.

=== Vision ===
Retinol is an essential compound in the cycle of light-activated chemical reactions called the "visual cycle" that underlies vertebrate vision. Retinol is converted by the protein RPE65 within the pigment epithelium of the retina into 11-cis-retinal. This molecule is then transported into the retina's photoreceptor cells (the rod or cone cells in mammals) where it binds to an opsin protein and acts as a light-activated molecular switch. When 11-cis-retinal absorbs light it isomerizes into all-trans-retinal. The change in the shape of the molecule in turn changes the configuration of the opsin in a cascade that leads to the neuronal firing, which signals the detection of light. The opsin then splits into the protein component (such metarhodopsin) and the cofactor all-trans-retinal. The regeneration of active opsin requires conversion of all-trans-retinal back to 11-cis-retinal via retinol. The regeneration of 11-cis-retinal occurs in vertebrates via the conversion of all-trans-retinol to 11-cis-retinol in a sequence of chemical transformations that occurs primarily in the pigment epithelial cells.

Without adequate amounts of retinol, regeneration of rhodopsin is incomplete and night blindness occurs. Night blindness, the inability to see well in dim light, is associated with a deficiency of vitamin A, a class of compounds that includes retinol and retinal. In the early stages of vitamin A deficiency, the more light-sensitive and abundant rods, which have rhodopsin, have impaired sensitivity, and the cone cells are less affected. The cones are less abundant than rods and come in three types, each contains its own type of iodopsin, the opsins of the cones. The cones mediate color vision, and vision in bright light (day vision).

=== Glycoprotein synthesis ===
Glycoprotein synthesis requires adequate vitamin A status. Retinol binds to the nucleotide sugar GDP-mannose to form mannosyl retinyl phosphate (MRP), an intermediate donor which transfers mannose residues to protein-bound oligosaccharide chains. In severe vitamin A deficiency, lack of glycoproteins may lead to corneal ulcers or liquefaction.

=== Immune system ===
Vitamin A is involved in maintaining a number of immune cell types from both the innate and acquired immune systems. These include the lymphocytes (B-cells, T-cells, and natural killer cells), as well as many myelocytes (neutrophils, macrophages, and myeloid dendritic cells). Vitamin A maintains immune barriers in the gut through its activity as retinoic acid.

=== Skin ===
Deficiencies in vitamin A and retinoic acid have been linked to an increased susceptibility to skin infection and inflammation. Vitamin A appears to modulate the innate immune response and maintains homeostasis of epithelial tissues and mucosa through its metabolite, retinoic acid (RA). As part of the innate immune system, toll-like receptors in skin cells respond to pathogens and cell damage by inducing a pro-inflammatory immune response which includes increased RA production. The epithelium of the skin encounters bacteria, fungi and viruses. Keratinocytes of the epidermal layer of the skin produce and secrete antimicrobial peptides (AMPs). Production of AMPs resistin and cathelicidin, are promoted by RA. Another way that vitamin A helps maintain a healthy skin and hair follicle microbiome, especially on the face, is by reduction of sebum secretion, which is a nutrient source for bacteria.

Retinol is used topically, in often unregulated cosmetic applications, claiming to mitigate the visible effects of ageing on the skin. Clinical and histological improvement is observed, but is not maintained after application is discontinued. When applied topically there is very little systemic absorption through the skin. Retinol has been the subject of clinical studies regarding its ability to reduce fine wrinkles and roughness on the face and neck.

All-trans retinol has been used in over-the-counter cosmetic products since 1984. Retinol is chemically unstable in topical formulations and is sensitive to factors such as light, oxygen, heat, and heavy metals. Decomposition occurs through two distinct pathways: unwanted photoisomerization catalyzing the formation of cis isomers which are poorly absorbed, and radical-mediated oxidations cleaving the molecule's carbon chain. Formulation approaches including retinol derivatives, antioxidants, chelating agents, and lipid-based or nanoformulation systems have been investigated to improve stability, tolerability, and skin delivery.

A common side effect of topical retinoid therapy is "retinoid dermatitis", irritation or reaction characterized by erythema, scaling, dryness, and pruritis. Topical retinol has been regulated as a cosmetic ingredient in the European Union and UK since November 2025; under Commission Regulation 2024/996, retinol was limited to a maximum of 0.05% retinol equivalent in body lotion and 0.3% in other leave-on and rinse-off products, with mandatory labelling.

=== Red blood cells ===
Vitamin A may be needed for normal red blood cell formation; deficiency causes abnormalities in iron metabolism. Vitamin A is needed to produce the red blood cells from stem cells through retinoid differentiation.

== Units of measurement ==
When referring to dietary allowances or nutritional science, retinol is usually measured in international units (IU). IU refers to biological activity and therefore is unique to each individual compound, however, 1 IU of retinol is equivalent to approximately 0.3 micrograms (300 nanograms).

== Nutrition ==
Vitamin properties
Solubility	Fat
RDA (adult male)	900 μg/day
RDA (adult female)	700 μg/day
RDA upper limit (adult male)	3,000 μg/day
RDA upper limit (adult female)	3,000 μg/day
Deficiency symptoms
Night blindness; Keratomalacia; Pale, dry skin
Excess symptoms
Liver toxicity; Dry skin; Hair loss; Teratological effects; Osteoporosis (suspected, long-term)
Common sources
Liver and other organs; fortified Dairy products

This vitamin plays an essential role in vision, particularly night vision, normal bone and tooth development, reproduction, and the health of skin and mucous membranes (the mucus-secreting layer that lines body regions such as the respiratory tract). While Vitamin A is often considered to be an antioxidant that prevents cancers, it does not have antioxidant activity and is shown to promote the development of many cancers.

There are two sources of dietary vitamin A. Retinyl ester or retinol forms, which are immediately available to the body or carotene precursors, also known as provitamins, which must be converted to active forms by the body. These are obtained from fruits and vegetables containing yellow, orange and dark green pigments, known as carotenoids, the most well-known being β-carotene. For this reason, amounts of vitamin A are measured in Retinol Equivalents (RE). One RE is equivalent to 0.001 mg of retinol, or 0.006 mg of β-carotene, or 3.3 International Units of vitamin A.

Vitamin A is fat-soluble and is stored in the liver and fat tissue. When required by a particular part of the body, the liver releases some vitamin A, which is carried by the blood and delivered to the target cells and tissues.

=== Dietary intake ===
The Dietary Reference Intake (DRI) Recommended Daily Amount (RDA) for vitamin A for a 25-year-old male is 900 micrograms/day, or 3000 IU. National Health Service daily recommended values are slightly lower at 700 micrograms for men and 600 micrograms for women.

During the absorption process in the intestines, retinol is incorporated into chylomicrons as the ester form, and it is these particles that mediate transport to the liver. Liver cells store vitamin A as the ester, and when retinol is needed in other tissues, it is de-esterifed and released into the blood as the alcohol. Retinol then attaches to a serum carrier, retinol binding protein, for transport to target tissues. A binding protein inside cells, cellular retinoic acid binding protein, serves to store and move retinoic acid intracellularly.

=== Deficiency ===
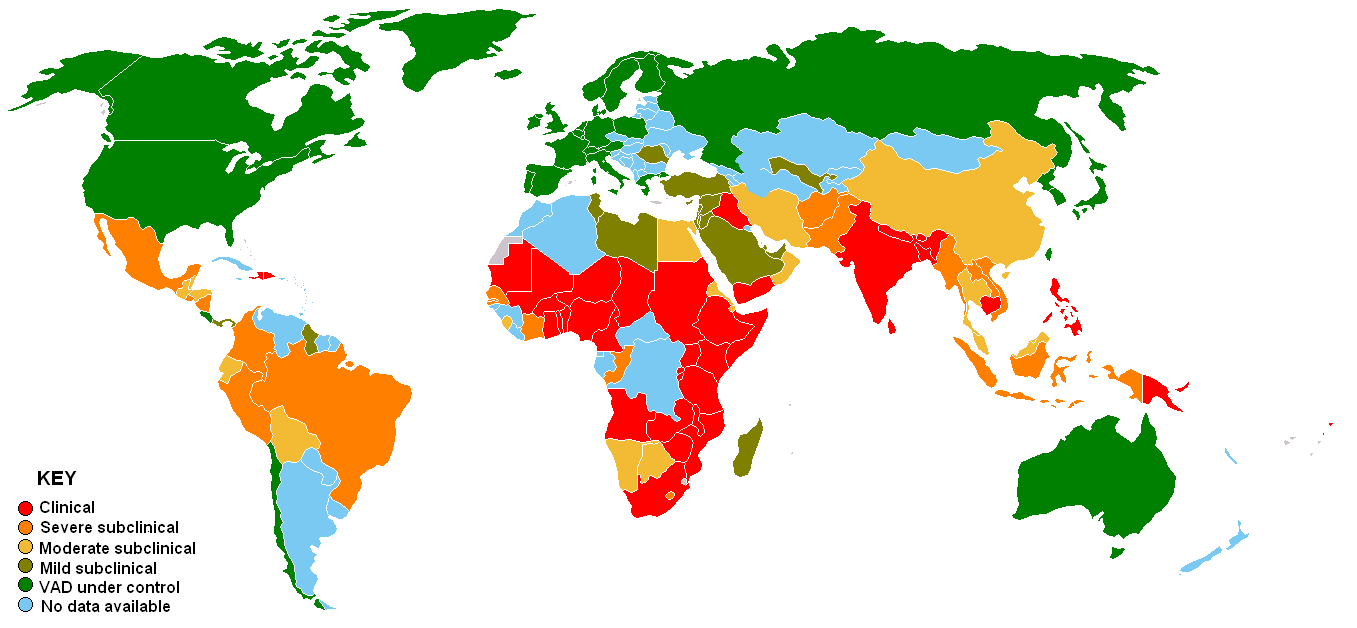
Prevalence of vitamin A deficiency in 1995

Vitamin A deficiency is common in developing countries but rarely seen in developed countries. Approximately 250,000 to 500,000 malnourished children in the developing world go blind each year from a deficiency of vitamin A. Vitamin A deficiency in expecting mothers increases the mortality rate of children shortly after childbirth. Night blindness is one of the first signs of vitamin A deficiency. Vitamin A deficiency contributes to blindness by depleting the necessary form needed for rhodopsin.

=== Sources ===
Retinoids are found naturally only in foods of animal origin. Each of the following contains at least 0.15 mg of retinoids per 1.75–7 oz (50–198 g):

- Cod liver oil
- Butter
- Liver (beef, pork, chicken, turkey, fish)
- Eggs
- Cheese, milk

== Chemistry ==
Many different geometric isomers of retinol, retinal and retinoic acid are possible as a result of either a trans or cis configuration of four of the five double bonds found in the polyene chain. The cis isomers are less stable and can readily convert to the all-trans configuration (as seen in the structure of all-trans-retinol shown at the top of this page). Nevertheless, some cis isomers are found naturally and carry out essential functions. For example, the 11-cis-retinal isomer is the chromophore of rhodopsin, the vertebrate photoreceptor molecule. Rhodopsin is composed of the 11-cis-retinal covalently linked via a Schiff base to the opsin protein (either rod opsin or blue, red, or green cone opsins). The process of vision relies on the light-induced isomerisation of the chromophore from 11-cis to all-trans resulting in a change of the conformation and activation of the photoreceptor molecule. The ease at which retinol isomerizes has been attributed to the molecule's small HOMO-LUMO gap, which permits photons to excite an electron into high-energy π* orbitals. Retinol's double bonds accordingly acquire temporary single bond character, allowing unhindered rotation about the intermolecular axis. When the molecule returns to its ground state, rotation is hindered again, locking the molecular geometry in a configuration possibly different from its former state.

Many of the non-visual functions of vitamin A are mediated by retinoic acid, which regulates gene expression by activating nuclear retinoic acid receptors. The non-visual functions of vitamin A are essential in the immunological function, reproduction, and embryonic development of vertebrates as evidenced by the impaired growth, susceptibility to infection, and birth defects observed in populations receiving suboptimal vitamin A in their diet.

== Synthesis ==
=== Biosynthesis ===
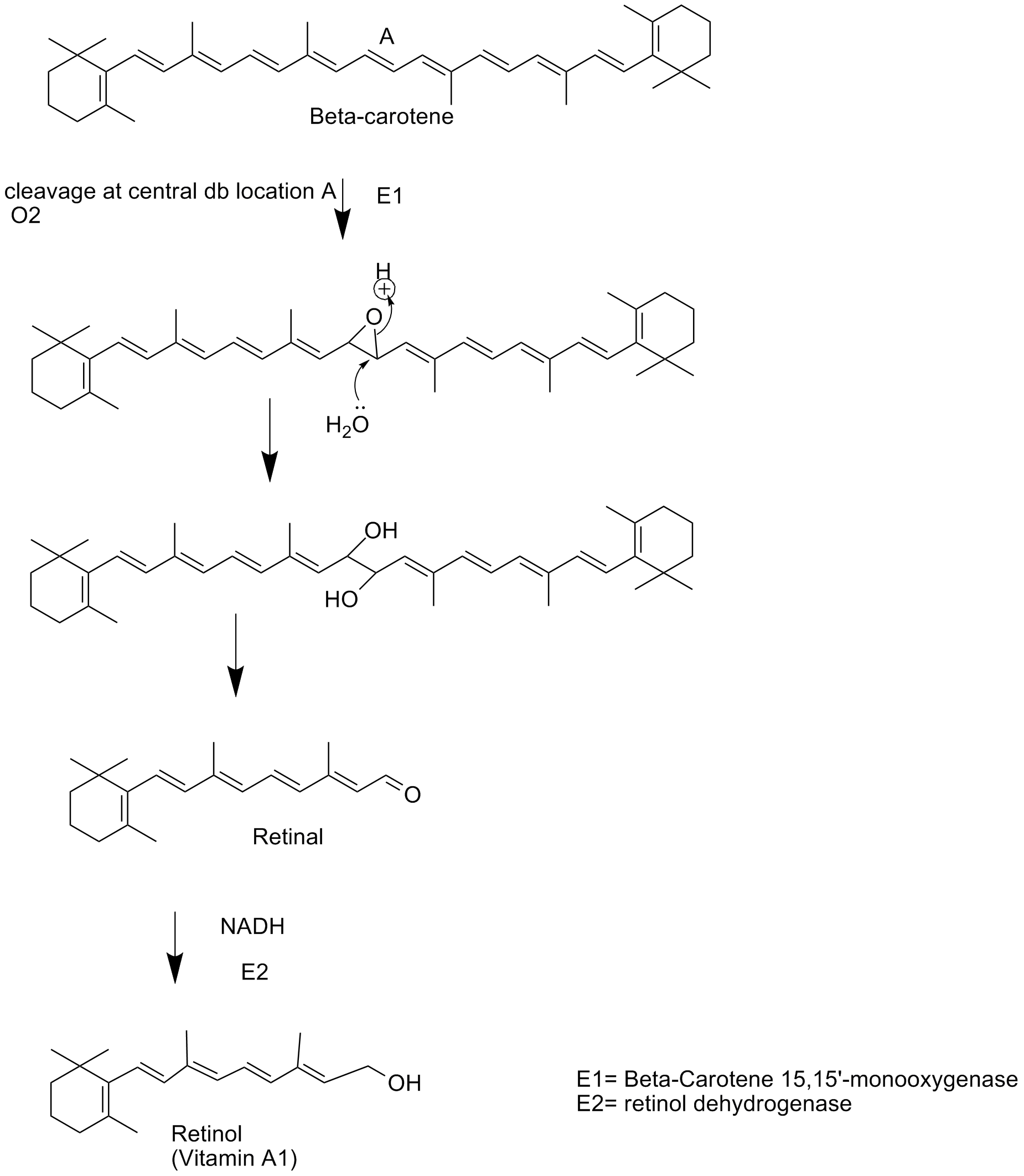
Vitamin A biosynthesis

Retinol is synthesized from the breakdown of β-carotene. First, the β-carotene 15,15'-monooxygenase cleaves β-carotene at the central double bond, creating an epoxide. This epoxide is then attacked by water creating two hydroxyl groups in the center of the structure. The cleavage occurs when these alcohols are oxidized to the aldehydes using NADH. This compound is called retinal. Retinal is then reduced to retinol by the enzyme retinol dehydrogenase. Retinol dehydrogenase is an enzyme that is dependent on NADH.

=== Industrial synthesis ===
β-ionone ring

Retinol is made industrially via total synthesis using either a method developed by BASF or a Grignard reaction utilized by Hoffman-La Roche. The two major suppliers, DSM and BASF, are believed to use total synthesis.

The world market for synthetic retinol is primarily for animal feed, leaving approximately 13% for a combination of food, prescription medication, and dietary supplement use. The first industrialized synthesis of retinol was achieved by the company Hoffmann-La Roche in 1947. In the following decades, eight other companies developed their own processes. β-Ionone, synthesized from acetone, is the essential starting point for all industrial syntheses. Each process involves elongating the unsaturated carbon chain. Pure retinol is extremely sensitive to oxidization and is prepared and transported at low temperatures and oxygen-free atmospheres. When prepared as a dietary supplement or food additive, retinol is stabilized as the ester derivatives retinyl acetate or retinyl palmitate. Before 1999, three companies, Roche, BASF, and Rhone-Poulenc controlled 96% of global vitamin A sales. In 2001, the European Commission imposed total fines of 855.22 Euros on these and five other companies for their participation in eight distinct market-sharing and price-fixing cartels that dated back to 1989. Roche sold its vitamin division to DSM in 2003. DSM and BASF have the major share of industrial production.

== History ==
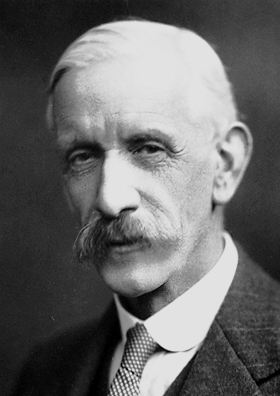
Frederick Gowland Hopkins, 1929 Nobel Prize for Physiology or Medicine

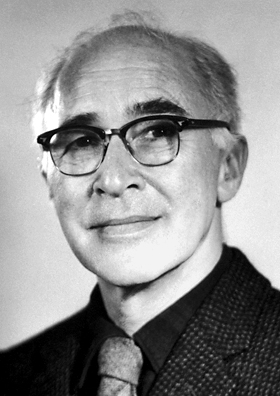
George Wald, 1967 Nobel Prize for Physiology or Medicine

In 1912, Frederick Gowland Hopkins demonstrated that unknown accessory factors found in milk, other than carbohydrates, proteins, and fats were necessary for growth in rats. Hopkins received a Nobel Prize for this discovery in 1929. One year later, Elmer McCollum, a biochemist at the University of Wisconsin–Madison, and colleague Marguerite Davis identified a fat-soluble nutrient in butterfat and cod liver oil. Their work confirmed that of Thomas Burr Osborne and Lafayette Mendel, at Yale, also in 1913, which suggested a fat-soluble nutrient in butterfat. The "accessory factors" were termed "fat-soluble" in 1918 and later "vitamin A" in 1920. In 1931, Swiss chemist Paul Karrer described the chemical structure of vitamin A. Retinoic acid and retinol were first synthesized in 1946 and 1947 by two Dutch chemists, David Adriaan van Dorp and Jozef Ferdinand Arens.

In 1967, George Wald was a co-recipient of the Nobel Prize in Physiology and Medicine "..."for their discoveries concerning the primary physiological and chemical visual processes in the eye." Photoreceptor cells in the eye contain a chromophore composed of the protein opsin and 11-cis retinal. When struck by light, 11-cis retinal undergoes photoisomerization to all-trans retinal and via signal transduction cascade sends a nerve signal to the brain. The all-trans retinal is reduced to all-trans retinol and travels back to the retinal pigment epithelium to be recycled to 11-cis retinal and conjugated to opsin.

Although vitamin A was not confirmed as an essential nutrient and a chemical structure described until the 20th century, written observations of conditions created by deficiency of this nutrient appeared much earlier in history. Sommer classified historical accounts related to vitamin A and/or manifestations of deficiency as follows: "ancient" accounts; 18th- to 19th-century clinical descriptions (and their purported etiologic associations); early 20th-century laboratory animal experiments, and clinical and epidemiologic observations that identified the existence of this unique nutrient and manifestations of its deficiency.
