= C12H22O =

The molecular formula C_{12}H_{22}O (molar mass: 182.307 g/mol, exact mass: 182.1671 u) may refer to:

- Cyclododecanone
- Geosmin
- 2-Heptylcyclopentanone
- Codlemon
