= C16H25NO2 =

The molecular formula C_{16}H_{25}NO_{2} may refer to:

- 5-MeO-DPAC
- Dendrobine
- Desvenlafaxine
- Emixustat
- Hydroxy alpha sanshool
- Pentethylcyclanone
- Tramadol
