= C12H14N2O3 =

The molecular formula C_{12}H_{14}N_{2}O_{3} (molar mass: 234.25 g/mol, exact mass: 234.1004 u) may refer to:

- α-Methyl-5-hydroxytryptophan
- Cyclopentobarbital
- Diproqualone
- 5-Methoxytryptophan
