= Cyclopentanone =

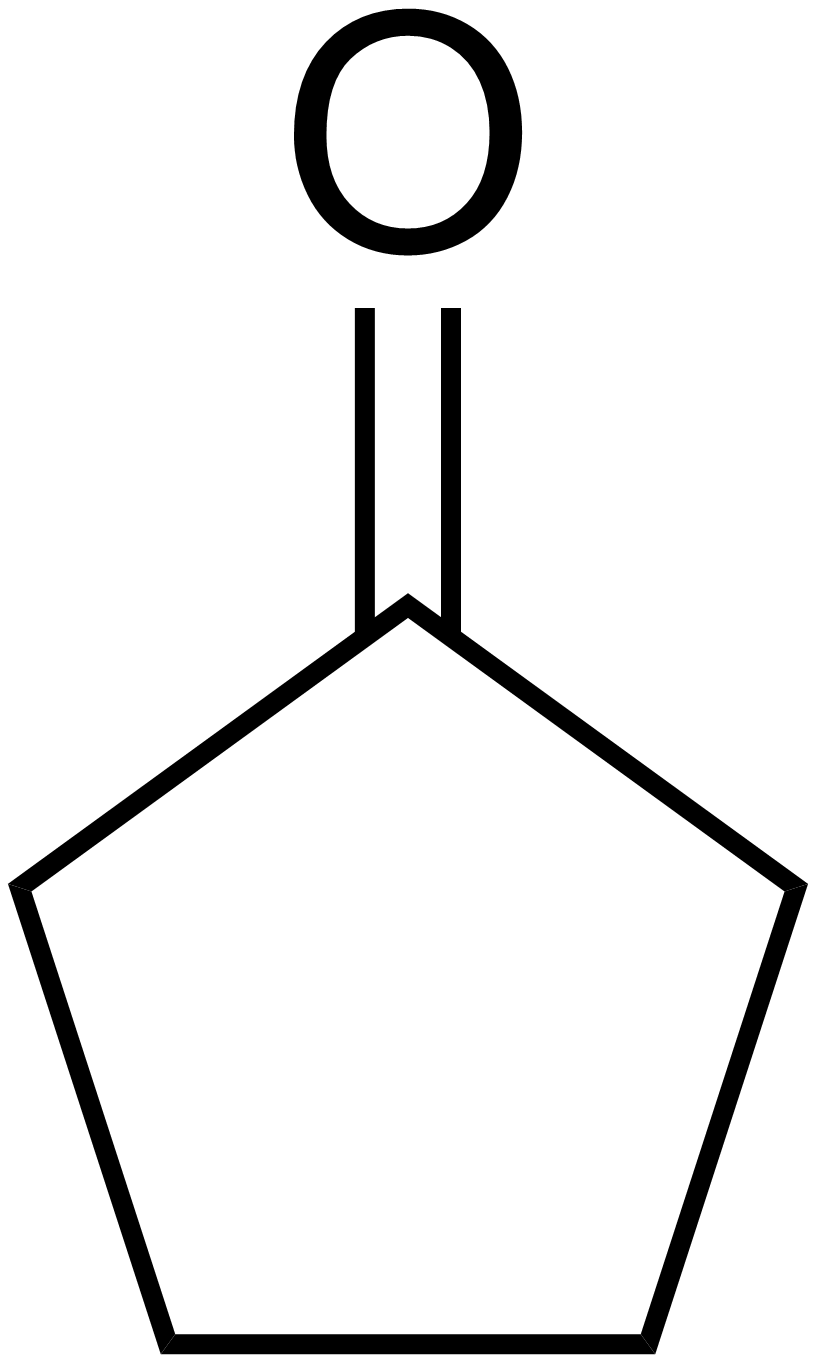
Cyclopentanone
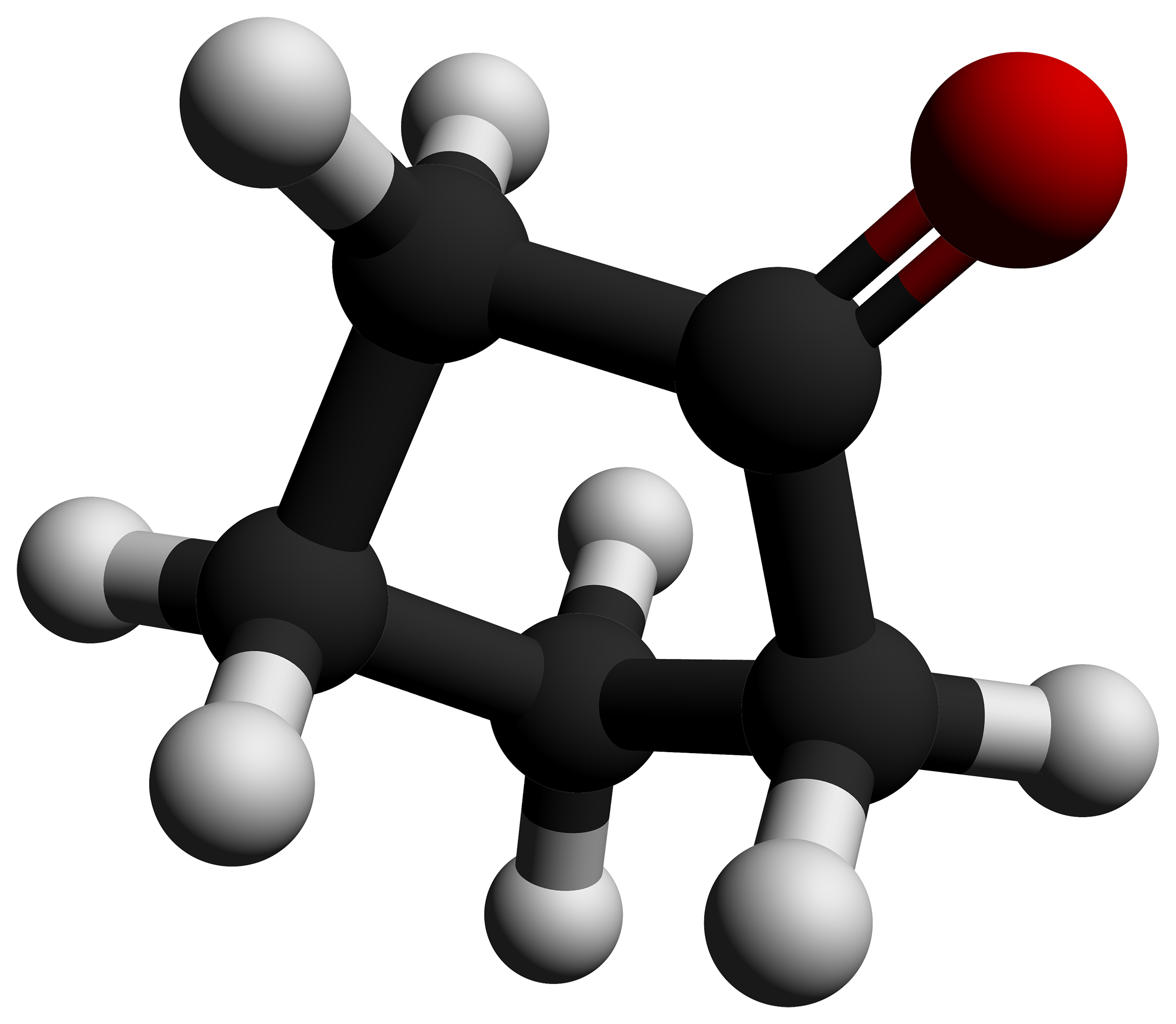

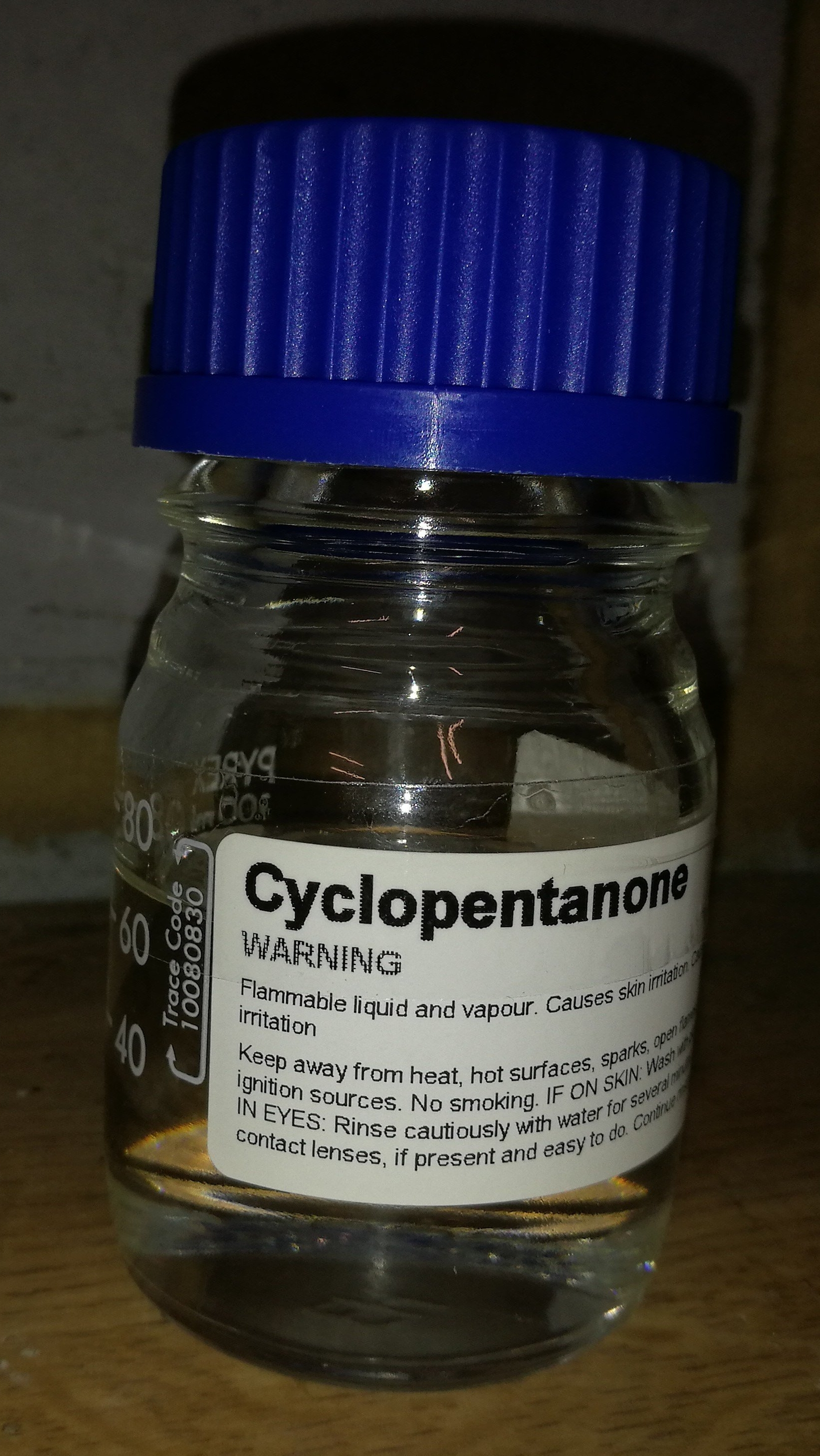

Names
- Preferred IUPAC name Cyclopentanone
- Other names Ketocyclopentane; Adipic ketone

Identifiers
CAS Number	120-92-3
3D model (JSmol)	Interactive image
ChEBI	CHEBI:16486
ChEMBL	ChEMBL18620
ChemSpider	8141
ECHA InfoCard	100.004.033
KEGG	C00557
PubChem CID	8452
RTECS number	GY4725000
UNII	220W81TN3S
CompTox Dashboard (EPA)	DTXSID3029154
- InChI: InChI=1S/C5H8O/c6-5-3-1-2-4-5/h1-4H2 Key: BGTOWKSIORTVQH-UHFFFAOYSA-N; InChI=1/C5H8O/c6-5-3-1-2-4-5/h1-4H2 Key: BGTOWKSIORTVQH-UHFFFAOYAP
- SMILES: C1CCC(=O)C1

Properties
Chemical formula	C_{5}H_{8}O
Molar mass	84.118 g·mol^{−1}
Appearance	clear, colorless liquid
Odor	peppermint-like
Density	0.95 g/cm^{3}, liquid
Melting point	−58.2 °C (−72.8 °F; 215.0 K)
Boiling point	130.6 °C (267.1 °F; 403.8 K)
Solubility in water	Slightly soluble
Magnetic susceptibility (χ)	−51.63·10^{−6} cm^{3}/mol

Hazards
- GHS labelling
Pictograms	(GHS02: Flammable) (GHS07: Exclamation mark)
Signal word	Warning
Hazard statements	H226, H315, H319
Precautionary statements	P210, P302+P352, P305+P351+P338
Flash point	26 °C (79 °F; 299 K)
Safety data sheet (SDS)	Cyclopentanone

Related compounds
Related ketones	cyclohexanone 2-pentanone 3-pentanone cyclopentenone
Related compounds	cyclopropane
- Except where otherwise noted, data are given for materials in their standard state (at 25 °C [77 °F], 100 kPa). verify (what is ?) Infobox references

Cyclopentanone is the organic compound with the formula (CH_{2})_{4}CO. This cyclic ketone is a colorless volatile liquid.

== Preparation ==
Ketonic decarboxylation of adipic acid gives cyclopentanone. The reaction is conducted at elevated temperatures in the presence of barium hydroxide.

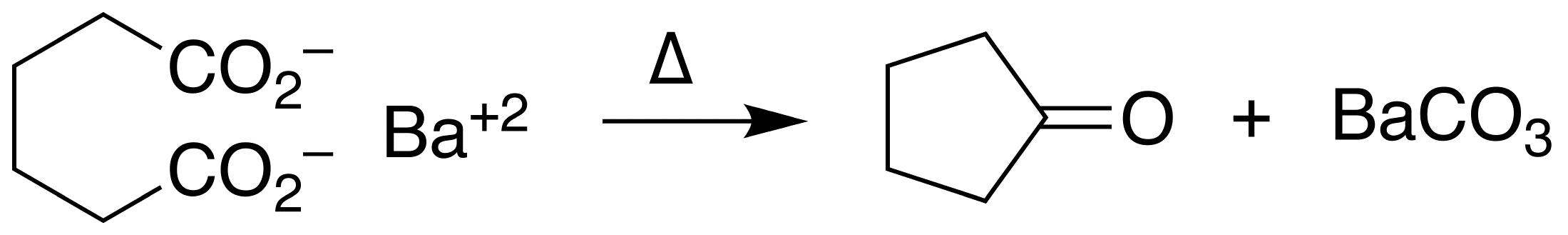

The Pd-catalyzed oxidation of cyclopentene also gives cyclopentanone.

== Uses ==
Cyclopentanone is common precursor to fragrances, especially those related to jasmine and jasmone. Examples include 2-pentyl- and 2-heptylcyclopentanone. It is a versatile synthetic intermediate, being a precursor to cyclopentobarbital.

Cyclopentobarbital, a drug made from cyclopentanone

Cyclopentanone is also used to make cyclopentamine, the pesticide pencycuron, and pentethylcyclanone.

It is also used as a precursor to cubane-1,4-dicarboxylate, which is used to synthesize other substituted cubanes, such as the high explosives heptanitrocubane and octanitrocubane.
