= Carotenoid oxygenase =

Retinal pigment epithelial membrane protein
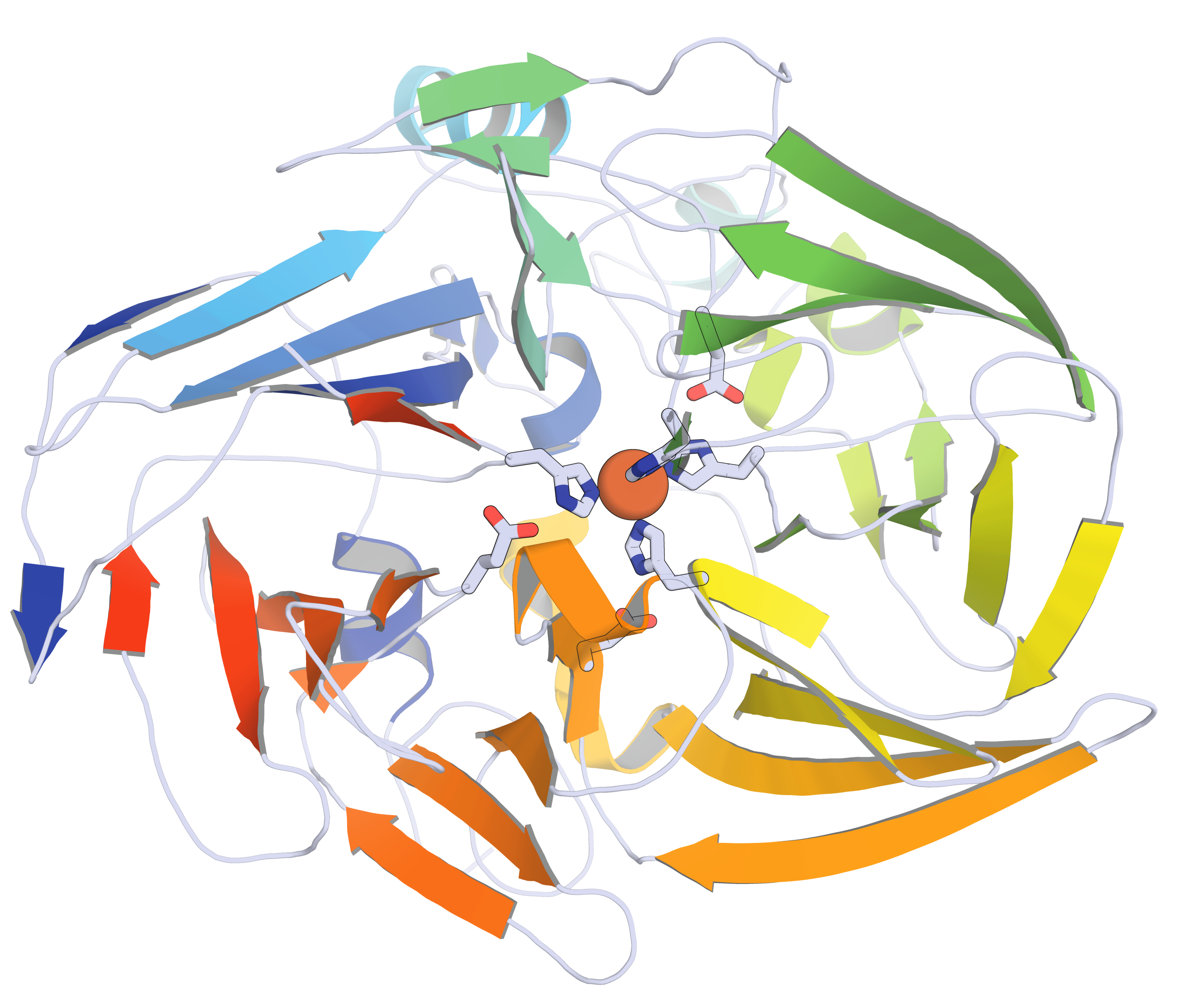
- The Structure of a Retinal-Forming Carotenoid Oxygenase.

Identifiers
- Symbol: RPE65
- Pfam: PF03055
- InterPro: IPR004294
- SCOP2: 2biw / SCOPe / SUPFAM
- OPM superfamily: 103
- OPM protein: 2biw
Available protein structures:
- PDB: IPR004294 PF03055 (ECOD; PDBsum)
- AlphaFold: IPR004294; PF03055

Carotenoid oxygenases are a family of enzymes involved in the cleavage of carotenoids to produce, for example, retinol, commonly known as vitamin A. This family includes an enzyme known as RPE65 which is abundantly expressed in the retinal pigment epithelium where it catalyzed the formation of 11-cis-retinol from all-trans-retinyl esters.

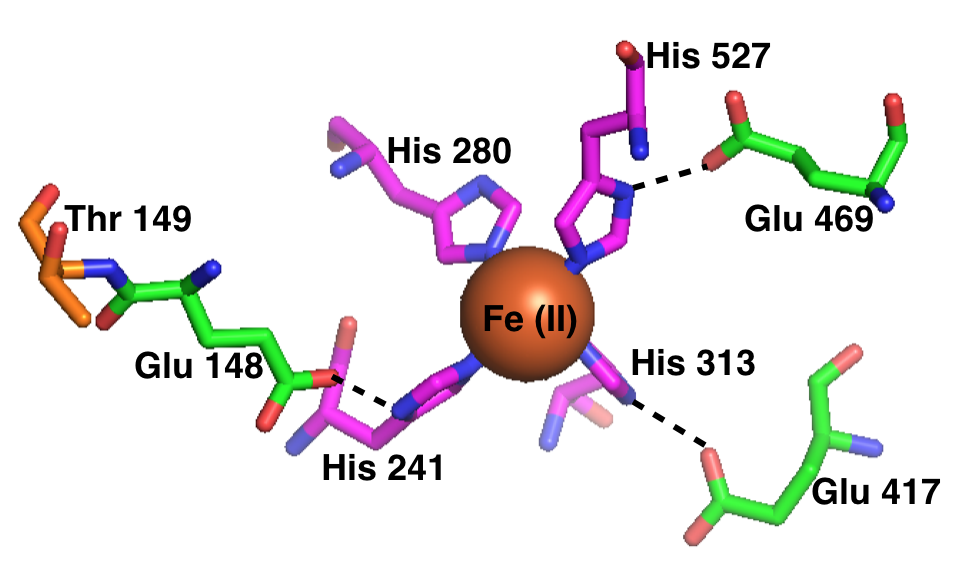
The RPE65 iron(II) cofactor, showing its coordination with 4 histidine residues and 3 glutamic acid residues.

Carotenoids such as beta-carotene, lycopene, lutein and beta-cryptoxanthin are produced in plants and certain bacteria, algae and fungi, where they function as accessory photosynthetic pigments and as scavengers of oxygen radicals for photoprotection. They are also essential dietary nutrients in animals. Carotenoid oxygenases cleave a variety of carotenoids into a range of biologically important products, including apocarotenoids in plants that function as hormones, pigments, flavours, floral scents and defence compounds, and retinoids in animals that function as vitamins, chromophores for opsins and signalling molecules. Examples of carotenoid oxygenases include:

- Beta-carotene 15,15'-monooxygenase (BCO1) from animals, which cleaves beta-carotene symmetrically at the central double bond to yield two molecules of retinal.
- Beta-carotene-9',10'-dioxygenase (BCO2) from animals, which cleaves beta-carotene asymmetrically to apo-10'-beta-carotenal and beta-ionone, the latter being converted to retinoic acid. Lycopene is also oxidatively cleaved.
- 9-cis-epoxycarotenoid dioxygenase from plants, which cleaves 9-cis xanthophylls to xanthoxin, a precursor of the hormone abscisic acid. Yellow skin, which is a common phenotype in domestic chicken, is influenced by the accumulation of carotenoids in skin due to absence of beta-carotene dioxygenase 2 (BCDO2) enzyme. Inhibition of expression of BCO2 gene is caused by a regulatory mutation.
- Apocarotenoid-15,15'-oxygenase from bacteria and cyanobacteria, which converts beta-apocarotenals rather than beta-carotene into retinal. This protein has a seven-bladed beta-propeller structure.
- Retinal pigment epithelium 65 kDa protein (RPE65) from vertebrates which is important for the production of 11-cis retinal during visual opsin regeneration.

Members of the family use an iron(II) active center, usually held by four histidines.

== Human proteins containing this domain ==
BCO2; BCO1; RPE65;
