= Christian Hamel =

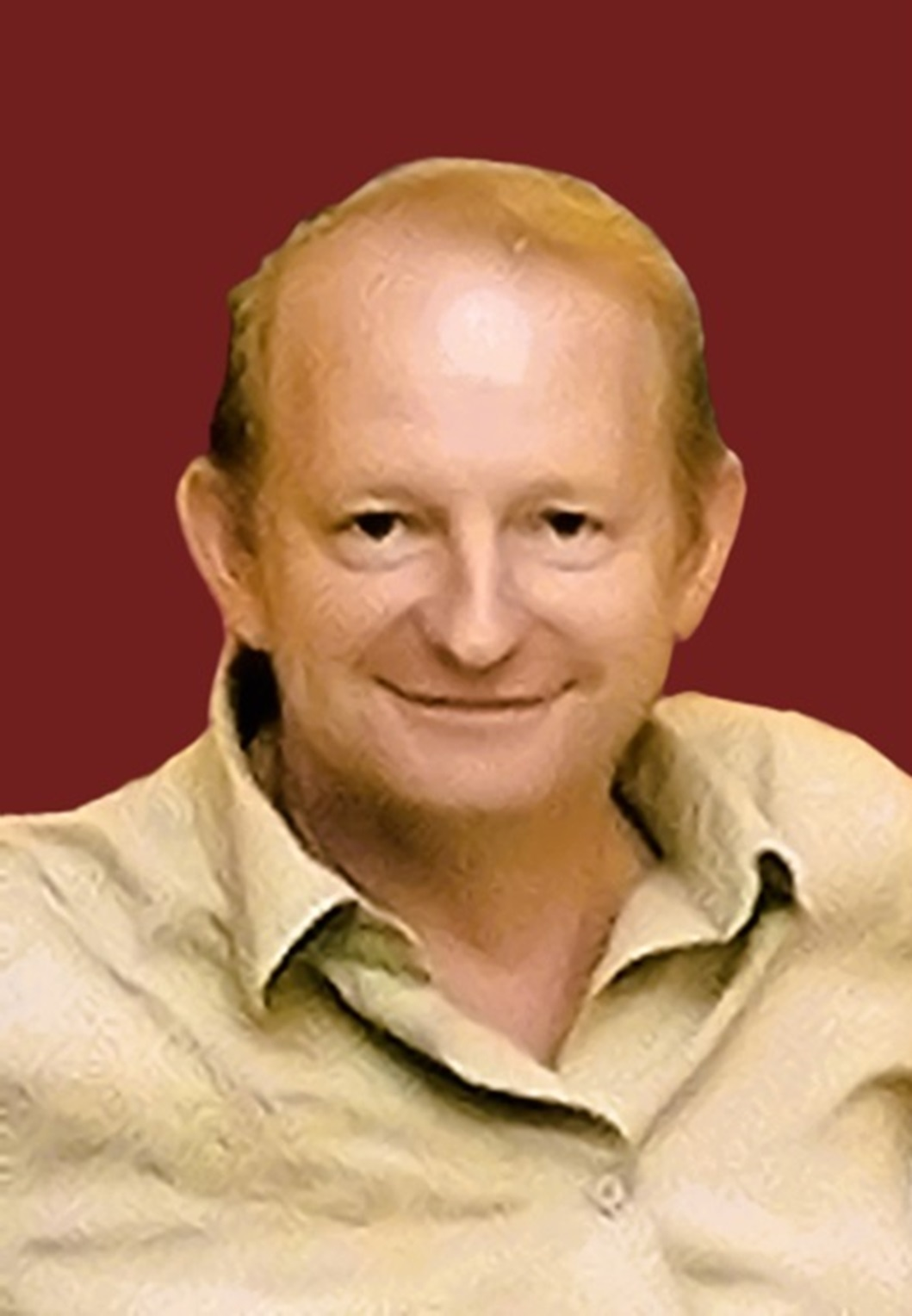

Christian Hamel (4 October 1955 – 15 August 2017) was a French Professor at the Institute for Neurosciences of Montpellier, Hôpital Saint Eloi (INM) research unit INSERM 583 of the University. He studied transduction, integration and disorders of sensory and motor systems with the ultimate goal of finding treatments for degeneration of the retina and optic nerve.

Hamel discovered and described in 1993 the RPE65 protein. Retinal pigment epithelium-specific 65 kDa protein is an enzyme in the vertebral visual pigment. The next year he mapped the RPE65 gene to human chromosome 1 (mouse chromosome 3) and refined it to 1p31 by fluorescence in situ hybridization. His research interests were to find the causes of inherited diseases of the retina and optic nerve.
