= Cyclopentanone monooxygenase =

Class of enzymes

Identifiers
- EC no.: 1.14.13.16
- CAS no.: 37364-15-1

Databases
- IntEnz: IntEnz view
- BRENDA: BRENDA entry
- ExPASy: NiceZyme view
- KEGG: KEGG entry
- MetaCyc: metabolic pathway
- PRIAM: profile
- PDB structures: RCSB PDB PDBe PDBsum
- Gene Ontology: AmiGO / QuickGO
Search
- PMC: articles
- PubMed: articles
- NCBI: proteins

Cyclopentanone monooxygenase (EC 1.14.13.16) is an enzyme that catalyzes the chemical reaction

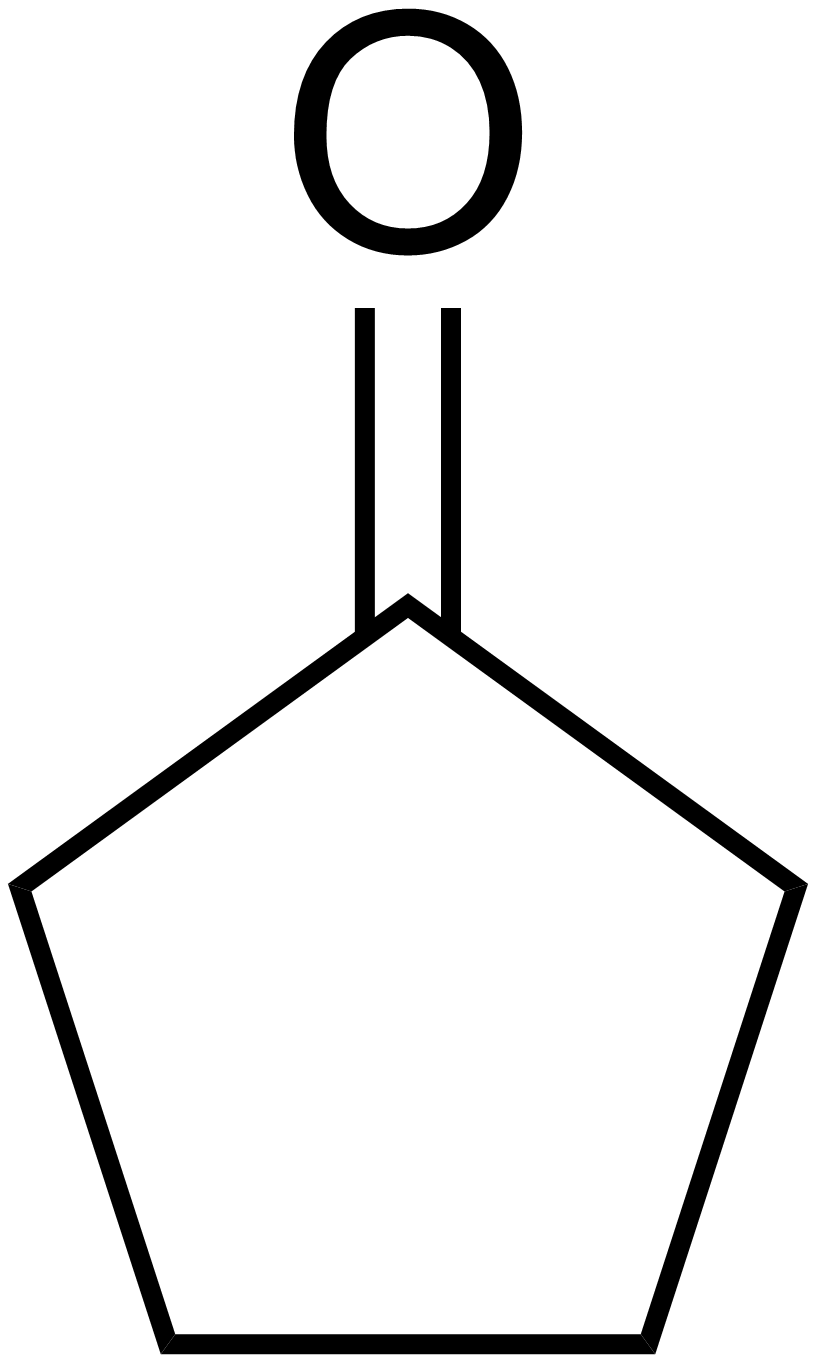
Cyclopentanone
+ NADPH + H^{+}
O_{2}
H_{2}O
δ-Valerolactone
+ NADP^{+}

The four substrates of this enzyme are cyclopentanone, reduced nicotinamide adenine dinucleotide phosphate (NADPH), oxygen and a proton. Its products are δ-valerolactone, oxidised NADP^{+}, and water.

This enzyme belongs to the family of oxidoreductases, specifically those acting on paired donors, with molecular oxygen as oxidant and incorporation of one of atoms. The systematic name of this enzyme class is cyclopentanone,NADPH:oxygen oxidoreductase (5-hydroxylating, lactonizing). It is also called cyclopentanone oxygenase.
