= Jean Bennett =

Biomedical engineer

Jean Bennett is the F. M. Kirby Professor of Ophthalmology in the Perelman School of Medicine at the University of Pennsylvania. Her research focuses on gene therapy for retinal diseases. Her laboratory developed the first FDA approved gene therapy for use in humans, which treats a rare form of blindness. She was elected a member of the National Academy of Sciences in 2022.

== Education ==
Bennett attended Hopkins School in New Haven, and graduated with honors from Yale University in 1976, with a bachelor of science in biology. Her father, William R. Bennett Jr., was a member of the faculty there. Her brother is William Bennett (oboist). In 1980, she obtained a Doctorate of Philosophy in Zoology; Cell And Development Biology from the University of California, Berkeley. Bennett continued on to Harvard University to receive her Doctor of Medicine (MD) in 1986.

== Career ==
=== Early research ===
Bennett received her PhD in zoology from the University of California, Berkeley in 1980 under Dr. Daniel Mazia. Her graduate research focused on the early development of sea urchin embryos. She moved on to postdoctoral work at the University of California, San Francisco under the guide of Dr. Roger Pedersen. As a postdoctoral student, she collaborated with Dr. William French Anderson developing molecular techniques for gene editing. In 1982, she left this position to attend medical school at Harvard University.

At Harvard, Bennett studied human genetics with Leon Rosenberg and Wayne Fenton (Yale), and she also investigated Down's syndrome and Alzheimer's disease with John Gearhart, Mary Lou Oster-Granite, and Roger Reeves (Johns Hopkins). From this work, she was awarded a career development grant from the Foundation Fighting Blindness to begin research on gene therapy for retinitis pigmentosa (genetic blindness).

=== Development of Luxturna ===
To develop an effective gene therapy in the retina, Bennett started by investigating adenoviruses and adeno-associated viruses (AAV) for gene editing in mice and non-human primates at the Institute for Human Gene Therapy at the University of Pennsylvania. The field of gene therapy was stymied after the death of Jesse Gelsinger during 1999 in a clinical trial for gene editing. However, Bennett pushed forward and demonstrated that AAV-mediated delivery of a functional RPE65 gene significantly improved sight in near-blind dogs.

Based on their pre-clinical data, Bennett's team pursued clinical trials in children with a defective form of the RPE65 gene. Their initial trials showed a stark improvement in light sensitivity and visual function in these children. Based on this, the therapy, marketed as LUXTURNA®, was approved by the FDA for use in humans. Currently, her laboratory is investigating gene therapy approaches for other retinal diseases.

== Awards and patents ==
=== Awards ===
- 2018 – Sanford Lorraine Cross Award, Sanford Health
- 2018 – António Champalimaud Vision Award,
- 2018 – Marion Spencer Fay Award,
- 2026 – Breakthrough Prize in Life Sciences

=== Patents ===
- Method of treating or retarding the development of blindness, (2012).
- Methods, systems, and computer readable media for testing visual function using virtual mobility tests, (2019).
- Trans-viral vector mediated gene transfer to the retina, (abandoned).
- Modified AAV8 capsid for gene transfer for retinal therapies, (2015).
- Proviral plasmids and production of recombinant adeno-associated virus, (2016).
- Method of treating or retarding the development of blindness, (abandoned).
- Gene therapy for ocular disorders, (2018).
- Gene therapy for treating peroxisomal disorders, (2018).
- Trans-splicing molecules, (2019).
- Gene therapy for ocular disorders, (2018).
- Syringe actuator, (2010).
- Methods and compositions for treatment of disorders and diseases involving RDH12, (2019).
- Gene therapy for ocular disorders, (2018).
- Enhanced AAV-mediated gene transfer for retinal therapies, (2019).
- Synergistic combination of neuronal viability factors and uses thereof, (2020).
- AAV vectors expressing Sec10 for treating kidney damage, (abandoned).
- Methods and compositions for treatment of ocular disorders and blinding diseases, (2020).
- Apparatus and methods for testing visual function and functional vision at varying luminance levels, (2019).
- Compositions and methods for correction of heritable ocular disease, (2021).
- Vision test for determining retinal disease progression, (2021).
- Compositions and methods for self-regulated inducible gene expression, (2019).
- AAV7 viral vectors for targeted delivery of RPE cells (Application PCT/US2009/041606)
- Method for transducing cells with primary cilia, (2020).
- Compositions and methods for treatment of disorders related to CEP290, (2018).
