= Retinol isomerase =

Enzyme

retinol isomerase

Identifiers
- EC no.: 5.2.1.7
- CAS no.: 109740-80-9

Databases
- IntEnz: IntEnz view
- BRENDA: BRENDA entry
- ExPASy: NiceZyme view
- KEGG: KEGG entry
- MetaCyc: metabolic pathway
- PRIAM: profile
- PDB structures: RCSB PDB PDBe PDBsum
- Gene Ontology: AmiGO / QuickGO
Search
- PMC: articles
- PubMed: articles
- NCBI: proteins

In enzymology, a retinol isomerase (EC 5.2.1.7) is an enzyme that catalyzes the chemical reaction

all-trans-retinol $\rightleftharpoons$ 11-cis-retinol

Hence, this enzyme has one substrate, all-trans-retinol, and one product, 11-cis-retinol. These enzymes are alternatively referred to as retinoid isomerases.

This enzyme belongs to the family of isomerases, specifically cis-trans isomerases. The systematic name of this enzyme class is all-trans-retinol 11-cis-trans-isomerase. This enzyme is also called all-trans-retinol isomerase. This enzyme participates in retinol metabolism.

In vertebrates, RPE65 is the active retinol isomerase in the visual cycle. A lack of RPE65 function results in congenital blindness in children (specifically Leber congenital amaurosis). Emixustat, a partial inhibitor of RPE65, is currently in FDA clinical trials for the treatment of age-related macular degeneration.
