= Apocarotenoid =

Apocarotenoids are organic compounds which occur widely in living organisms. They are derived from carotenoids by oxidative cleavage, catalyzed by carotenoid oxygenases. Examples include the vitamin A retinoids retinal, retinoic acid, and retinol; and the plant hormone abscisic acid.
