= William R. Bennett Jr. =

American physicist (1930–2008)

- Born: William Ralph Bennett Jr. January 30, 1930
- Died: June 29, 2008 (aged 78)
- Education: Princeton University (BA); Columbia University (PhD)
- Occupation: Physicist
- Employer: Yale University
- Awards: IEEE Morris N. Liebmann Memorial Award (1965)

William Ralph Bennett Jr. (January 30, 1930 – June 29, 2008) was an American physicist known for his pioneering work on gas lasers. He spent most of his career on the faculty of Yale University.

== Career ==
The son of the noted physicist William R. Bennett Sr., Bennett Jr. received his bachelor's degree in physics from Princeton University. Bennett's graduate work in physics was on spectroscopy and collisions of the second kind in the noble gases. He received his Ph.D. from Columbia University. Bennett became a tenured professor at Yale University in 1962 and retired in 2000.

He and Ali Javan co-invented the first gas laser (the helium-neon laser) at Bell Laboratories in Murray Hill, New Jersey. He discovered the argon ion laser, was first to observe spectral hole burning effects in gas lasers, and created a theory of hole burning effects on laser oscillation. He was co-discoverer of lasers using electron impact excitation in each of the noble gases, dissociative excitation transfer in the neon-oxygen laser (the first chemical laser), and collision excitation in several metal vapor lasers. He was one of the first to incorporate the use of computers to teach physics and, with his daughter Dr. Jean Bennett, devised a method of real-time spectral phonocardiography for the detection and classification of heart murmurs. He set a stringent limit on the existence of “The Fifth Force” and showed that it was improbable that magnetic fields from power lines could cause cancer. He wrote eight books, held twelve patents and published over 120 research papers. He received the 1965 IEEE Morris N. Liebmann Memorial Award.

His research on the physics of musical instruments became the basis of a popular course he gave at Yale. His principal avocation was playing chamber music. He studied the clarinet with Simeon Bellison and performed as a clarinet soloist with several amateur symphony orchestras. His son William Bennett was a professional oboist.

== Honors ==
- Member of Sigma Xi
- Fellow of the American Physical Society; the Optical Society of America, and the IEEE;
- Listed in A Century of Honor (IEEE Press).
- 1947 – Stanley Silverman Prize in Chemistry
- 1963 – Alfred P. Sloan Foundation Fellow
- 1964 – Honorary MA, Yale University
- 1965 – IEEE Morris N. Liebmann Memorial Award (for the invention of the gas laser)
- 1967 – J. S. Guggenheim Foundation Fellow
- 1972 – C. B. Sawyer Chair, Yale University
- 1974, 1975, 1976 – Annual "Ten Best Teachers" award, Yale Student Course Critique
- 1974 – Fellow, IEEE ("for contributions to the realization and understanding of gas lasers")
- 1975 – Honorary D.Sc., University of New Haven
- 1977 – Western Electric Fund Award of the ASME ("for excellence in instruction of engineering students")
- 1977 – Outstanding Patent Award of the Research and Development Council of New Jersey for U.S.Patent No. 3614653 (for the first gas laser)
- 1987 – John F. Enders Research Fellow
- 1994 – Eli Whitney Award of Connecticut Patent Law Association (for the invention of spectral phonocardiograph.)
- 1997 – Life Fellow, IEEE
- 2000 – DeVane Medal for Distinguished Scholarship and Teaching at Yale University, Phi Beta Kappa

== Patents ==
- "[Pulsed Helium-Neon] Gas Optical Maser" (with A. Javan), U. S. Patent No. 3149290 (granted Sept. 15, 1964)
- "[Dissociative Transfer] Gas Optical Maser" (with A. Javan), U. S. Patent No. 3159707 (granted Dec. 1, 1964)
- "Frequency Stabilized Optical Maser [based on Spectral Hole-burning]", U. S. Patent No. 3172057 (granted Feb. 16, 1965)
- "[High Power] Gaseous Optical Maser", U. S. Patent No. 3172057 (granted March 2, 1965)
- "Optical Maser Employing Multiple Gases [Krypton, Xenon and Radon with Helium]" (with W. L. Faust, R. A. McFarlane and C. K. N.Patel, U. S. Patent No. 3278858 (granted Oct. 11, 1966)
- "Laser Utilizing Collision Depopulation [of the Lower Level]" (with G. Gould), U. S. Patent No. 3562662 (Granted Feb. 9, 1971)
- "Low-Level Laser with Cyclic Excitation [Copper, Manganese, etc., metal vapor lasers]" (with Gordon Gould and W. T. Walter), U. S. Patent No. 3576500 (granted April 27, 1971)
- "[Cw Helium-Neon] Optical Maser" (with D. R. Herriott and A. Javan), U. S. Patent No.3614653 (granted Oct. 19, 1971)
- "Method and Device for Compensating for Partial Hearing Loss", U. S. Patent No. 4868880 (granted Sept. 19, 1989)
- "Dynamic Spectral Phonocardiograph" (with J. B. Maguire), U. S. Patent No. 4967760 (granted Nov. 6, 1990).
- "Dynamic Spectral Phonocardiograph [using Computer Diagnostics]" (with J. B. Maguire), U.S.Patent No. 5012815 (granted May 7, 1991).
- "Laser with Reduced Intensity Fluctuations" ("Laser Stabilitron" with V. P. Chebotayev), U. S. Patent No.5251229 (Oct. 5, 1993).

== Books ==
- 1964 – Gas Lasers (Moscow, Izdattel'stvo "MIR"), translated into Russian by S. G. Rautian and A. S. Khaikin
- 1965 – Chemical Lasers, (Editor with K. Schuler) (Applied Optics Supplement No. 2, Optical Soc. of Amer., Washington, DC)
- 1976 – Introduction to Computer Applications for Non-Science Students, (Prentice-Hall, Englewood-Cliffs, N.J.)
- 1976 – Scientific and Engineering Problem Solving with the Computer, (Prentice-Hall, Englewood-Cliffs, N.J.)
- 1977 – The Physics of Gas Lasers, (Gordon and Breach, London)
- 1979 – Atomic Gas Laser Transition Data (Plenum Publishing Company, New York)
- 1994 – Health and Low Frequency Electromagnetic Fields (Yale University Press, New Haven)

== See also ==
- List of lasers
- List of laser articles
