= Beta-carotene 15,15'-dioxygenase =

Enzyme found in humans

β-carotene 15,15'-dioxygenase

Identifiers
- EC no.: 1.13.11.63
- CAS no.: 37256-60-3

Databases
- BRENDA: enzyme data
- ExPASy: NiceZyme view
- KEGG: enzyme entry
- MetaCyc: metabolic pathway
- Rhea: reactions
- PDB structures: RCSB PDB PDBe PDBsum
- Gene Ontology: AmiGO / QuickGO
Search
- PMC: articles
- PubMed: articles
- NCBI: proteins

BCO1

Identifiers
- Aliases: BCO1, BCDO, BCDO1, BCMO, BCMO1, BCO, beta-carotene oxygenase 1
- External IDs: OMIM: 605748; MGI: 1926923; GeneCards: BCO1
Enzyme activity
EC #	BRENDA	ExPASy	KEGG	MetaCyc
1.13.11.63	↗	↗	↗	↗

Gene location (Human)
Chr.	Chromosome 16 (human)
Band	16q23.2	Start	81,238,689 bp
Band	16q23.2	End	81,291,142 bp

Gene location (Mouse)
Chr.	Chromosome 8 (mouse)
Band	8|8 E1	Start	117,822,593 bp
Band	8|8 E1	End	117,860,459 bp
RNA expression pattern
Bgee	Human / Mouse (ortholog); Top expressed in: retinal pigment epithelium; jejunal mucosa; duodenum; palpebral conjunctiva; Epithelium of choroid plexus; rectum; mucosa of transverse colon; pancreatic ductal cell; gallbladder; islet of Langerhans / Top expressed in: gastrula; yolk sac; seminiferous tubule; decidua; intestinal villus; hepatobiliary system; liver; spermatid; embryo; embryo; More reference expression data
BioGPS	n/a
Gene ontology
Molecular function	oxidoreductase activity; beta-carotene 15,15'-dioxygenase activity; oxidoreductase activity, acting on single donors with incorporation of molecular oxygen, incorporation of two atoms of oxygen; dioxygenase activity; metal ion binding; retinal isomerase activity; carotenoid dioxygenase activity
Cellular component	cytosol
Biological process	retinol metabolic process; vitamin A biosynthetic process; retinoid metabolic process; retinal metabolic process; beta-carotene metabolic process; carotene catabolic process
Sources:Amigo / QuickGO
Orthologs
Databases	NCBI: entry; OMA: entry
Species	Human	Mouse
Entrez	53630	63857
Ensembl	ENSG00000135697	ENSMUSG00000031845
UniProt	Q9HAY6	Q9JJS6
RefSeq (mRNA)	NM_017429	NM_001163028; NM_021486
RefSeq (protein)	NP_059125	NP_001156500; NP_067461
Location (UCSC)	Chr 16: 81.24 – 81.29 Mb	Chr 8: 117.82 – 117.86 Mb
PubMed search
- Wikidata
View/Edit Human	View/Edit Mouse

In enzymology, beta-carotene 15,15'-dioxygenase, (EC 1.13.11.63) is an enzyme with systematic name beta-carotene:oxygen 15,15'-dioxygenase (bond-cleaving). In human it is encoded by the BCO1 gene (previously denoted BCDO1 or, misleadingly, BCMO1). This enzyme catalyses the following chemical reaction

beta-carotene + O_{2} → 2 all-trans-retinal

This is a cleavage reaction which cleaves β-carotene, utilizes molecular oxygen, is enhanced by the presence of bile salts and thyroxine, and generates two molecules of retinal. In humans, the enzyme is present in the small intestine and liver. The dioxygenase also asymmetrically cleaves beta-cryptoxanthin, trans-β-apo-8'-carotenal, beta-4'-apo-β-carotenal, alpha-carotene and gamma-carotene in decreasing order, creating one retinal molecule, all of these being substrates with a carbon chain greater than C_{30}, with at least one unsubstituted β-ionone ring.

This enzyme belongs to the (enzymatically-defined) family of oxidoreductases, specifically those acting on paired donors, with O_{2} as oxidant and incorporation or reduction of oxygen.

In general, carnivores are poor converters of ionone-containing carotenoids, and pure carnivores such as felids (cats) lack beta-carotene 15,15'-dioxygenase and cannot convert any carotenoids to retinal, resulting in none of the carotenoids being forms of vitamin A for these species. They must have preformed vitamin A in their diet.

Beta-carotene 15,15'-dioxygenase belongs to the (similarity-defined) family of carotenoid oxygenases (InterPro: IPR004294). Enzymes of this family contain a Fe^{2+} active site, coordinated usually by four His residues.

== Other names ==
This enzyme has sometimes been incorrectly called β-carotene 15,15′-monooxygenase (BCMO1).

== See also ==
- Carotenoid-9',10'-cleaving dioxygenase, encoded by BCO2
