= 2-Heptylcyclopentanone =

Names
- IUPAC name 2-Heptylcyclopentan-1-one

Identifiers
CAS Number	137-03-1
3D model (JSmol)	Interactive image
ChEMBL	ChEMBL3185887
ChemSpider	8386
ECHA InfoCard	100.004.794
EC Number	205-273-1
PubChem CID	8710
UNII	4984B2X8AH
CompTox Dashboard (EPA)	DTXSID8044547
- InChI: InChI=1S/C12H22O/c1-2-3-4-5-6-8-11-9-7-10-12(11)13/h11H,2-10H2,1H3 Key: PJXHBTZLHITWFX-UHFFFAOYSA-N
- SMILES: CCCCCCCC1CCCC1=O

Properties
Chemical formula	C_{12}H_{22}O
Molar mass	182.307 g·mol^{−1}
Density	0.89 g/cm^{3}
Boiling point	264.8 °C (508.6 °F; 538.0 K)

Hazards
- GHS labelling
Pictograms	(GHS07: Exclamation mark) (GHS09: Environmental hazard)
Signal word	Warning
Hazard statements	H315, H411
Precautionary statements	P264, P273, P280, P302+P352, P321, P332+P317, P362+P364, P391, P501
- Except where otherwise noted, data are given for materials in their standard state (at 25 °C [77 °F], 100 kPa). Infobox references

2-Heptylcyclopentanone is an organic compound from the group of ketones.

== Properties ==
At room temperature, heptylcyclopentanone is a colorless to yellowish liquid with a sweet, fruity or floral, jasmine-like odor. The compound is only slightly soluble in water, and is more soluble in solvents such as ethanol or diethyl ether. Heptylcyclopentanone is chiral, and has (R)- and (S)- enantiomers.

== Synthesis ==
In the first step of the synthesis of heptylcyclopentanone, cyclopentanone and heptanal react by aldol condensation. The resulting reaction product is reduced by hydrogenation to heptylcyclopentanone.

== Usage ==
Heptylcyclopentanone is used as a fragrance in perfumes, deodorants, soaps, shampoos, skin creams, and cleaning products, among others. It gives them a jasmine, lavender, or honeysuckle-like scent. The compound is also used to make δ-dodecalactone. The substance can also be used as a solvent for rubbers and nitrocellulose or vinyl resins.
