= William Bennett (oboist) =

American oboist

Background information
- Born: May 31, 1956; New Haven, Connecticut
- Died: February 28, 2013 (aged 56) San Francisco, California
- Genres: Classical
- Instrument: Oboe
- Years active: 1979–2013
- Formerly of: San Francisco Symphony

William Bennett (May 31, 1956 – February 28, 2013) was an American musician. He was the principal oboist for the San Francisco Symphony Orchestra. Bennett was also a talented caricaturist.

== Life ==
Bennett was born in New Haven, Connecticut, where his father William R. Bennett Jr. was a university professor. He joined the San Francisco Symphony in 1979, and was promoted to principal oboist in 1987, after Marc Lifschey's retirement.

John Harbison's oboe concerto was written for him.

Bennett died in San Francisco on February 28, 2013, a few days after collapsing on stage during a performance, as soloist, of the Oboe Concerto by Richard Strauss. He was 56 and is survived by his wife and two children.
