= Emixustat =

Chemical compound

Legal status
- Legal status: Investigational

Identifiers
- IUPAC name: (1R)-3-Amino-1-[3-(cyclohexylmethoxy)phenyl]propan-1-ol;hydrochloride
- CAS Number: 1141777-14-1
- PubChem CID: 25221720
- ChemSpider: 28528371
- UNII: 02DZ1HBF0M
- KEGG: D10348
- CompTox Dashboard (EPA): DTXSID50150665

Chemical and physical data
- Formula: C_{16}H_{25}NO_{2}
- Molar mass: 263.381 g·mol^{−1}
- 3D model (JSmol): Interactive image
- SMILES: C1CCC(CC1)COC2=CC=CC(=C2)[C@@H](CCN)O
- InChI: InChI=InChI=1S/C16H25NO2/c17-10-9-16(18)14-7-4-8-15(11-14)19-12-13-5-2-1-3-6-13/h4,7-8,11,13,16,18H,1-3,5-6,9-10,12,17H2/t16-/m1/s1; Key:WJIGGYYSZBWCGC-MRXNPFEDSA-N

Emixustat is a small molecule notable for its establishment of a new class of compounds known as visual cycle modulators (VCMs). Formulated as the hydrochloride salt, emixustat hydrochloride, it is the first synthetic medicinal compound shown to affect retinal disease processes when taken by mouth. Emixustat was developed based on the ground-breaking research of Ryo Kubota, MD, PhD at Acucela Inc., the company he founded, working with a team of chemists including Ian L. Scott. Emixustat has completed Phase 2/3 trials for dry, age-related macular degeneration (AMD), diabetic macular edema, and Stargardt Disease.

The compound is also being investigated as a potential therapy for proliferative diabetic retinopathy, diabetic macular edema and Stargardt disease. In 2008, Acucela Inc. partnered with Otsuka Pharmaceutical Company for the development of emixustat (ACU-4429) in an agreement totaling $263 million in cash and milestone payments.

Emixustat hydrochloride is a non-retinoid small molecule inhibitor of RPE65 (retinal pigment epithelium-specific 65 kDa protein, also known as retinoid isomerohydrolase). It is thought to reduce visual chromophore biosynthesis and prevent the accumulation of toxic retinal byproducts.

== Mechanism of action ==
A significant factor in the pathogenesis of age-related macular degeneration (AMD) is thought to be the toxic byproduct, N-retinylidene-N-retinylethanolamine (A2E). A2E is a major chromophore in lipofuscin and causes singlet oxygen production when exposed to high-energy light. A2E is formed from the release of all-trans-retinol within the outer segment disks of human photoreceptors.

Visual cycle

All-trans-retinol is an important component in the Visual Cycle, the mechanism by which light energy is converted into electrical energy within the eye. In the visual cycle, exposure to light causes 11-cis-retinal to isomerize to all-trans-retinal (as part of the rhodopsin complex). The isomerisation results in the release of chemical energy, which is processed into an electrical signal (by a series of different cells) that is transmitted to the brain. The all-trans-retinal is released from opsin, reduced to all-trans-retinol, then transported from the photoreceptor cells back to the RPE cells, where it is stored for recycling and future use as retinol palmitate.

The transportation of all-trans-retinal back to RPE cells is not 100% efficient, and a small amount of all-trans-retinal can escape. This condenses with membrane-bound ethanolamine to form a Schiff's base. A second molecule of all-trans-retinal reacts with the Schiff's base and forms A2E. The formation of A2E is largely associated with the rod photoreceptor cells. These cells account for approximately 95% of human photoreceptors, and turn over cis to trans retinol constantly under normal lighting conditions.

Emixustat hydrochloride is a synthetic small molecule non-retinoid designed to stop the Visual Cycle by inhibiting the formation of 11-cis-retinal. Stored all-trans-retinyl palmitate is simultaneously hydrolysed and isomerised to 11-cis-retinol by RPE-65. The 11-cis-retinol is oxidized to 11-cis retinal and transported to photoreceptor cells where it binds to opsin to form rhodopsin. Emixustat hydrochloride binds to RPE-65 and prevents the isomerohydrolase reaction. Without 11-cis-retinal, the rod photoreceptor cells no longer produce all-trans-retinol and production of A2E is halted.

The isomerisation of all-trans-retinol to 11-cis-retinol also plays a key role in the pathogenesis of diabetic macular edema (DME), but by a different outcome of the same mechanism. One of the consequences of diabetes is damage to blood vessels; damaged vessels are less able to carry oxygen, thus inhibiting one of the most important biological processes within the eye. Normal retinal cells require a very large amount of oxygen. When insufficient oxygen is available, vascular remodelling occurs and poorly remodelled blood vessels leak, causing edema. The conversion of all-trans-retinol to 11-cis-retinal is a very oxygen intensive process. By blocking the isomerisation of retinol, emixustat hydrochloride may decrease the oxygen demand of the retina and therefore liberate large amounts of oxygen for other processes.

In a completed Phase 1a study, the drug was "well tolerated" by male and female human participants, and demonstrated dose-dependent modulation of electroretinogram (ERG) signals. A Phase II study, completed in 2015, produced a dose dependent, reversible effect on rod function consistent with emixustat's planned mechanism of action.

== See also ==
- Visual phototransduction
- Retinol isomerase
