= RPE65 =

Protein-coding gene in humans

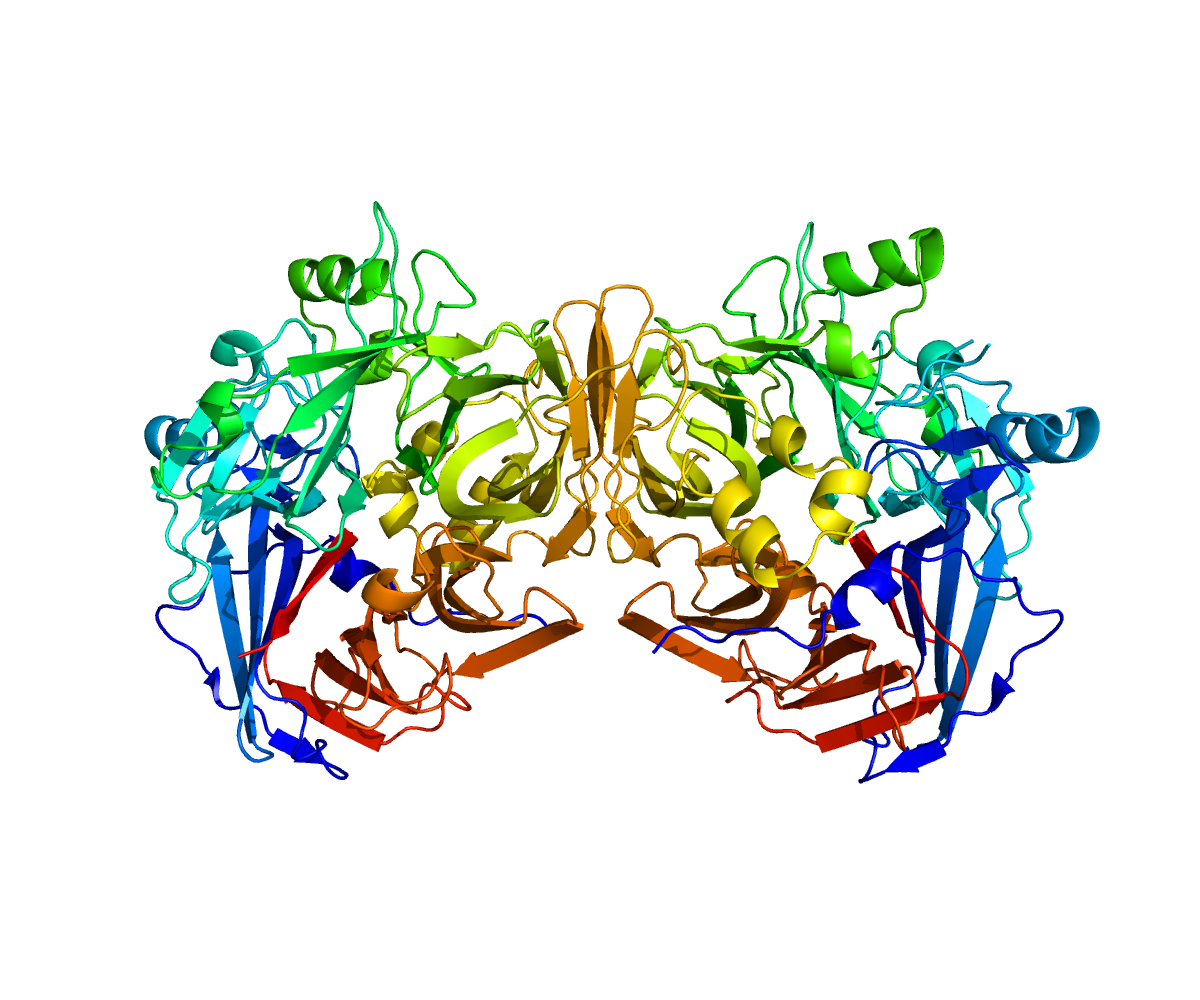

Identifiers
- Aliases: RPE65, BCO3, LCA2, RP20, mrd12, sretinal pigment epithelium-specific protein 65kDa, retinal pigment epithelium specific protein 65, retinoid isomerohydrolase, p63, retinoid isomerohydrolase RPE65
- External IDs: OMIM: 180069; MGI: 98001; HomoloGene: 20108; GeneCards: RPE65; OMA:RPE65 - orthologs

Gene location (Human)
Chr.	Chromosome 1 (human)
Band	1p31.3	Start	68,428,822 bp
Band	1p31.3	End	68,449,954 bp

Gene location (Mouse)
Chr.	Chromosome 3 (mouse)
Band	3 H4|3 82.52 cM	Start	159,304,812 bp
Band	3 H4|3 82.52 cM	End	159,330,958 bp
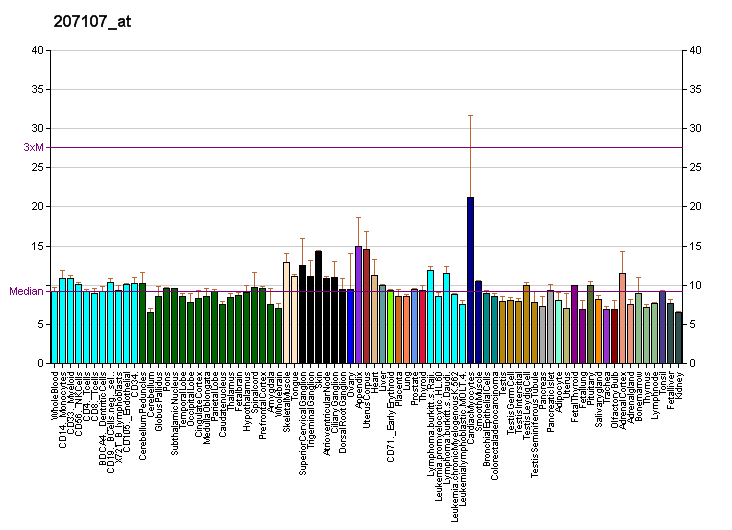
RNA expression pattern
Bgee	Human / Mouse (ortholog); Top expressed in: retinal pigment epithelium; testicle; optic nerve; Epithelium of choroid plexus; hypothalamus; substantia nigra; lower lobe of lung; C1 segment; seminal vesicula; ventricular zone / Top expressed in: retinal pigment epithelium; ciliary body; embryo; epithelium of lens; embryo; iris; dorsal striatum; neural layer of retina; superior frontal gyrus; cornea; More reference expression data
BioGPS	More reference expression data
Gene ontology
Molecular function	phosphatidylcholine binding; cardiolipin binding; phosphatidylserine binding; metal ion binding; oxidoreductase activity, acting on single donors with incorporation of molecular oxygen, incorporation of two atoms of oxygen; hydrolase activity; all-trans-retinyl-ester hydrolase, 11-cis retinol forming activity; all-trans-retinyl-palmitate hydrolase, 11-cis retinol forming activity; retinal isomerase activity; isomerase activity; retinol isomerase activity
Cellular component	cytoplasm; organelle membrane; cell body; membrane; intracellular membrane-bounded organelle; plasma membrane; endoplasmic reticulum; endoplasmic reticulum membrane
Biological process	insulin receptor signaling pathway; response to light stimulus; response to stimulus; retinol metabolic process; detection of light stimulus involved in visual perception; retinoid metabolic process; retinal metabolic process; retina morphogenesis in camera-type eye; retina homeostasis; retina development in camera-type eye; circadian rhythm; vitamin A metabolic process; camera-type eye development; neural retina development; visual perception; cellular response to electrical stimulus; zeaxanthin biosynthetic process
Sources:Amigo / QuickGO
Orthologs
Species	Human	Mouse
Entrez	6121	19892
Ensembl	ENSG00000116745	ENSMUSG00000028174
UniProt	Q16518	Q91ZQ5
RefSeq (mRNA)	NM_000329	NM_029987
RefSeq (protein)	NP_000320	NP_084263
Location (UCSC)	Chr 1: 68.43 – 68.45 Mb	Chr 3: 159.3 – 159.33 Mb
PubMed search
- Wikidata
View/Edit Human	View/Edit Mouse

Retinal pigment epithelium-specific 65 kDa protein (also known as RPE65) is a retinoid isomerohydrolase enzyme of the vertebrate visual cycle. RPE65 is expressed in the retinal pigment epithelium (RPE, a layer of epithelial cells that nourish the photoreceptor cells) and is responsible for the conversion of all-trans-retinyl esters to 11-cis-retinol during phototransduction. 11-cis-retinol is then used in visual pigment regeneration in photoreceptor cells. RPE65 belongs to the carotenoid oxygenase family of enzymes.

Mutations in the RPE65 gene have been associated with Leber's congenital amaurosis type 2 (LCA2) and retinitis pigmentosa (RP).

== Species distribution ==
RPE65 has been isolated from a wide range of vertebrates including zebra fish, chicken, mice, frogs, and humans. Its structure is highly conserved between species, particularly in the beta-propeller and likely membrane bound regions. The amino acid sequences of human and bovine RPE65 differ by less than 1%. The histidine residues of the beta-propeller structure and the bound iron(II) cofactor are 100% conserved across studied RPE65 orthologs and other members of the carotenoid oxygenase family.

== Structure ==
RPE65 is a dimer of two symmetrical, enzymatically independent subunits. The active site of each subunit has a seven-bladed beta-propeller structure with four histidines that hold an iron(II) cofactor. This structural motif is common across the studied members of the carotenoid oxygenase family of enzymes. RPE65 is strongly associated with the membrane of the smooth endoplasmic reticulum (sER) in RPE cells.

=== Active site ===
The active site of each RPE65 active site contains an Fe(II) cofactor bound by four histidines (His^{180}, His^{241}, His^{313}, and His^{527}), each contributed by a separate blade on the beta-propeller structure. Three of the four histidines are coordinated to nearby glutamic acid residues (Glu^{148}, Glu^{417}, and Glu^{469}), which are thought to help position the histidines to bind the iron cofactor in an octahedral geometry. Phe^{103}, Thr^{147}, and Glu^{148} surround the active site where they help stabilize the carbocation intermediate and increase the stereoselectivity of RPE65 for 11-cis-retinol over 13-cis-retinol.

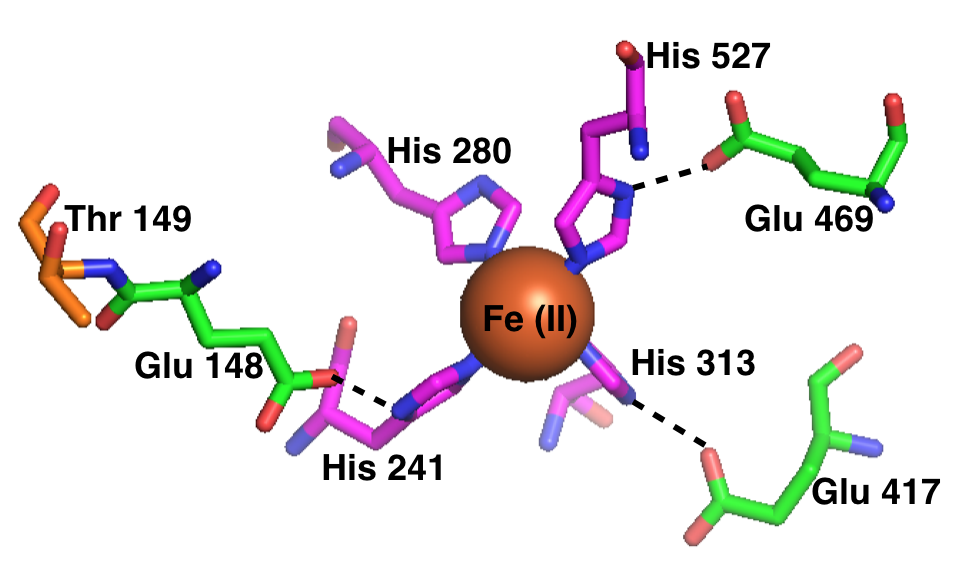
The RPE65 iron(II) cofactor, showing its coordination with 4 histidine residues and 3 glutamic acid residues.

Reactants and products likely enter and leave the active site through a hydrophobic tunnel which is thought to open into the lipid membrane for direct lipid substrate absorption. A second, smaller tunnel also reaches the active site and may serve as a pathway for water, but is too narrow to transport the retinoid reactants and products.

=== Membrane interactions ===
RPE65 is strongly associated with the membrane of the sER. sER is abnormally abundant in RPE cells due to their role in processing lipidic retinoids. Structural studies indicate that RPE65 is partially imbedded in the sER membrane via interactions between its hydrophobic face and the interior of the lipid membrane. This is supported by the need for detergent to solubilize RPE65. A major portion of RPE65's hydrophobic face, residues 109–126, forms an amphipathic alpha helix that likely contributes to the protein's membrane affinity. Additionally, Cys^{112} is palmitoylated in native RPE65, further supporting the theory that the hydrophobic face of RPE65 is imbedded in the membrane.

The hydrophobic face contains the entrance to the large tunnel that leads to the enzyme's active site. The presence of this channel on the hydrophobic face combined with RPE65's demonstrated ability to absorb substrate direction from the lipid bilayer is consistent with RPE65 being partially embedded in the membrane.

== Function ==
RPE65 is a critical enzyme in the vertebrate visual cycle found in the retinal pigmented epithelium. It is also found in rods and cones. The photoisomerization of 11-cis-retinal to all-trans-retinal initiates the phototransduction pathway through which the brain detects light. All-trans-retinol is not photoactive and therefore must be reconverted to 11-cis-retinal before it can recombine with opsin to form an active visual pigment. RPE65 reverses the photoisomerization by converting an all-trans-retinyl ester to 11-cis-retinol. Most commonly, the ester substrate is retinyl palmitate. The other enzymes of the visual cycle complete the reactions necessary to oxidize and esterify all-trans-retinol to a retinyl ester (RPE65's substrate) and to oxidize 11-cis-retinol to 11-cis-retinal (the required photoactive visual pigment component).

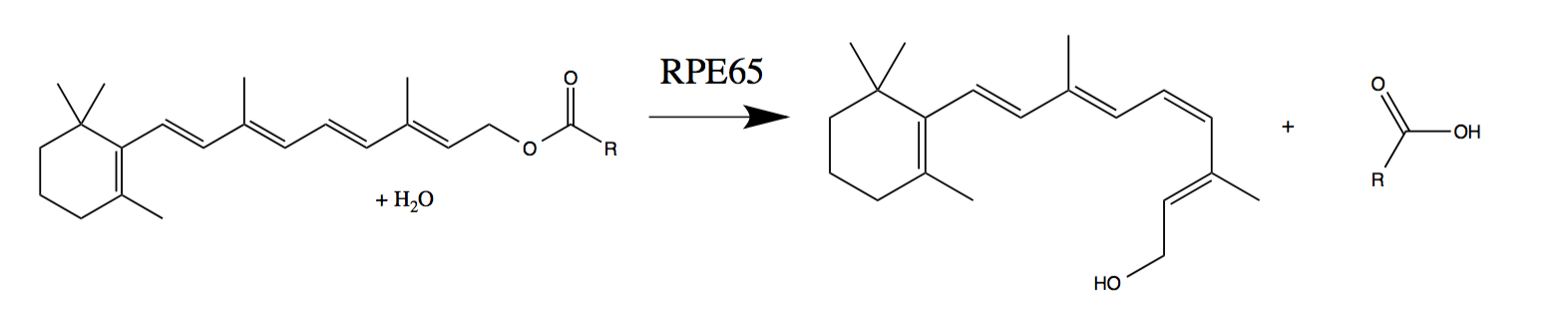
The reaction completed by RPE65 in the retinoid cycle.

RPE65 is also referred to as retinol isomerase or retinoid isomerase, owing to past debates about the enzyme's substrate and whether it was involved in ester hydrolysis.

=== Soluble RPE65 (sRPE65) ===
Previously, it was proposed that RPE65 exists in two, interconverted forms: membrane bound mRPE65 and soluble sRPE65. This theory suggested that the reversible conversion of sRPE65 to mRPE65 by palmitoylation at Cys^{231}, Cys^{329}, and Cys^{330} played a role in regulating the retinoid cycle and endowing mRPE65 with its membrane affinity. However, crystallographic studies of RPE65 have demonstrated that these residues are neither palmitoylated nor surface facing. New studies have also failed to confirm the presence of abundant soluble RPE65. Thus, this theory has been largely abandoned.

== Mechanism ==
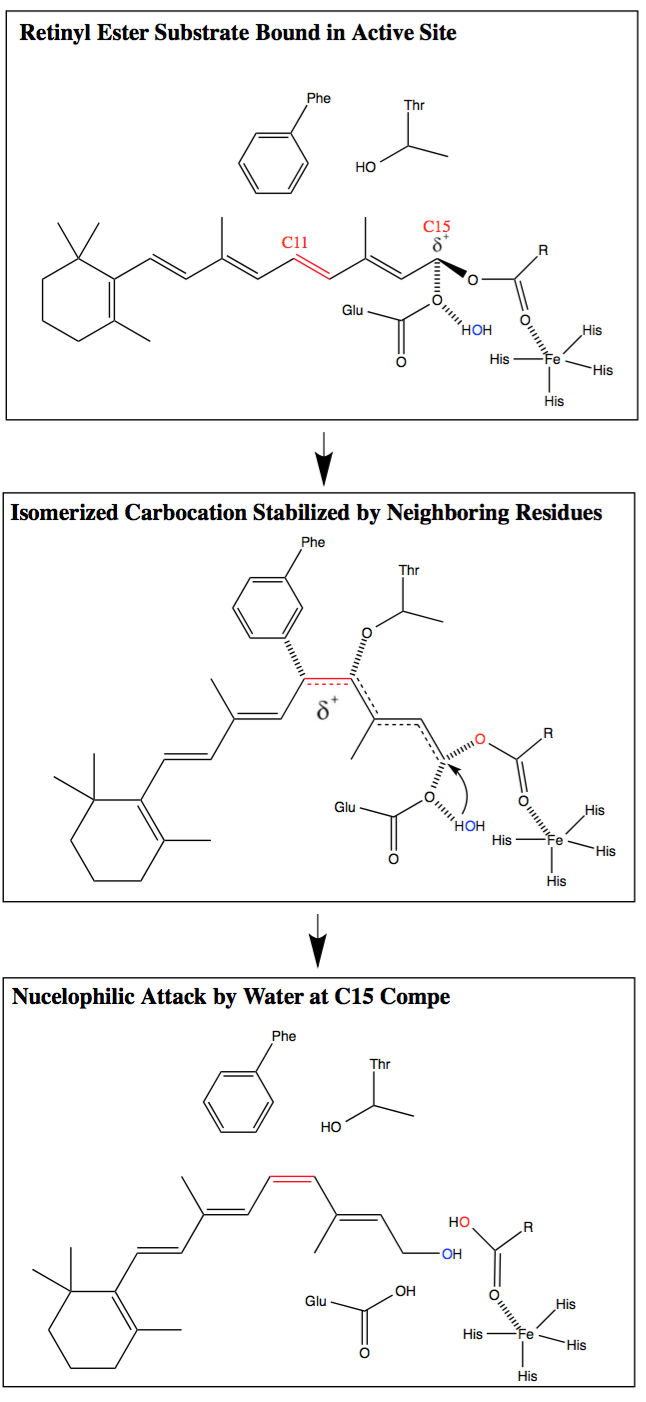
The proposed RPE65 O-alkyl cleavage mechanism. The residues shown are, clockwise from top left - Phe^{103}, Thr^{147}, His^{313}, His^{527}, His^{180}, His^{241}, and Glu^{148}.

RPE65 catalyzes the conversion of all-trans-retinyl ester to 11-cis-retinol through a proposed S_{N}1 O-alkyl bond cleavage. RPE65's combination of an O-alkyl ester cleavage, geometric isomerization, and water addition is currently thought to be unique in biology. However, O-alkyl ester cleavage reactions with similarly stabilized carbocation intermediates are used by organic chemists.

=== O-alkyl cleavage ===
The O-alkyl cleavage of the ester bond, assisted by an Fe(II) cofactor, creates a carbocation intermediate that is stabilized by the conjugated polyene chain. The delocalization of the carbocation reduces the bond order of the polyene chain, thereby reducing the activation energy of the trans-to-cis isomerization. Phe^{103} and Thr^{178} additionally stabilize the isomerized carbocation and are thought to be responsible for the stereoselectivity of the enzyme. After isomerization, a nucleophilic attack by water at C15 restores the conjugation of the polyene chain and completes the ester bond cleavage.

=== Alternate s_{n}2 mechanism ===
Nearly all other biochemical ester hydrolysis reactions occur through an addition-elimination reaction at the acyl carbon. However, isotope labeling studies have demonstrated that the oxygen on the final 11-cis-retinol product of RPE65 originates from the solvent rather than the reacting ester, supporting the O-alkyl cleavage mechanism. Another possible mechanism would begin with a nucleophilic attack at C11, but such an attack would rely on some nucleophile - most likely a cystine residue - to complete the isomerization portion of the reaction. Not only is the polyenyl ester probably not electron-poor enough to allow this reaction, but the active site region is lacking cystine residues to act as the nucleophile.

== Clinical significance ==
Mutations in this gene have been associated with Leber's congenital amaurosis type 2 (LCA2) and retinitis pigmentosa (RP). RPE65 mutations are the most commonly detected mutations in LCA patients in Denmark. The vast majority of RPE65 mutations in patients with LCA2 and RP occur in the beta-propeller regime and are believed to inhibit proper protein folding and iron cofactor binding. Particularly common propeller mutation sites are Tyr^{368} and His^{182}. Substitution at Arg^{91} is also common and have been shown to impact RPE65 membrane interactions and substrate uptake.

Though complete loss of function is associated with diseases such as LCA and RP, partial inhibition of RPE65 has been proposed as a treatment for age-related macular degeneration (AMD). All-trans-retinylamine (Ret-NH2) and emixustat have both been shown to competitively inhibit RPE65. Emixustat is currently undergoing FDA phase 3 clinical trials as a therapy for AMD.

Jean Bennett and Katherine A. High's work with the RPE65 mutation has reversed an inherited form of blindness. They received the first FDA approval of a gene therapy for a genetic disease, which is called Voretigene neparvovec.

== See also ==
- The Visual Cycle
