= Carotenoid-9',10'-cleaving dioxygenase =

Enzyme found in humans

BCO2

Identifiers
- Aliases: BCO2, B-DIOX-II, BCDO2, beta-carotene oxygenase 2
- External IDs: OMIM: 611740; MGI: 2177469; GeneCards: BCO2
Enzyme activity
EC #	BRENDA	ExPASy	KEGG	MetaCyc
1.13.11.71	↗	↗	↗	↗

Gene location (Human)
Chr.	Chromosome 11 (human)
Band	11q23.1	Start	112,175,510 bp
Band	11q23.1	End	112,224,699 bp

Gene location (Mouse)
Chr.	Chromosome 9 (mouse)
Band	9|9 A5.3	Start	50,444,387 bp
Band	9|9 A5.3	End	50,466,481 bp
RNA expression pattern
Bgee	Human / Mouse (ortholog); Top expressed in: right lobe of liver; apex of heart; myocardium of left ventricle; right auricle of heart; left adrenal cortex; right adrenal gland; right uterine tube; right adrenal cortex; cardiac muscle tissue of right atrium; right ventricle / Top expressed in: duodenum; jejunum; left lobe of liver; right kidney; intestinal villus; proximal tubule; morula; ileum; yolk sac; embryo; More reference expression data
BioGPS	n/a
Gene ontology
Molecular function	dioxygenase activity; oxidoreductase activity; oxidoreductase activity, acting on single donors with incorporation of molecular oxygen, incorporation of two atoms of oxygen; metal ion binding; beta,beta-carotene-9',10'-cleaving oxygenase activity; beta-carotene 15,15'-dioxygenase activity; retinal isomerase activity; carotenoid dioxygenase activity
Cellular component	mitochondrial matrix; intracellular anatomical structure; mitochondrion
Biological process	carotenoid metabolic process; regulation of mitochondrial membrane potential; xanthophyll metabolic process; regulation of reactive oxygen species metabolic process; retinoic acid metabolic process; carotene metabolic process; retinoid metabolic process; carotene catabolic process; retinal metabolic process
Sources:Amigo / QuickGO
Orthologs
Databases	NCBI: entry; OMA: entry
Species	Human	Mouse
Entrez	83875	170752
Ensembl	ENSG00000197580	ENSMUSG00000032066
UniProt	Q9BYV7	Q99NF1
RefSeq (mRNA)	NM_031938; NM_001037290; NM_001256397; NM_001256398; NM_001256400	NM_133217; NM_001359610
RefSeq (protein)	NP_001032367; NP_001243326; NP_001243327; NP_001243329; NP_114144	NP_573480; NP_001346539
Location (UCSC)	Chr 11: 112.18 – 112.22 Mb	Chr 9: 50.44 – 50.47 Mb
PubMed search
- Wikidata
View/Edit Human	View/Edit Mouse

Carotenoid-9',10'-cleaving dioxygenase

Identifiers
- EC no.: 1.13.11.71

Databases
- BRENDA: enzyme data
- ExPASy: NiceZyme view
- KEGG: enzyme entry
- MetaCyc: metabolic pathway
- Rhea: reactions
- PDB structures: RCSB PDB PDBe PDBsum
Search
- PMC: articles
- PubMed: articles
- NCBI: proteins

Carotenoid-9',10'-cleaving dioxygenase (EC 1.13.11.71) is an enzyme that in humans is encoded by the gene BCO2. Its systematic name is all-trans-beta-carotene:O_{2} oxidoreductase (9',10'-cleaving). This enzyme catalyses the following chemical reaction

all-trans-beta-carotene + O_{2} $\rightleftharpoons$ all-trans-10'-apo-beta-carotenal + beta-ionone

Carotenoid-9',10'-cleaving dioxygenase contains Fe^{2+}, and is found in the mitochondria of humans and other mammals.

== Other names ==
This enzyme has also been misleading called beta-carotene 9',10'-monooxygenase.

== See also ==
- Beta-carotene 15,15'-dioxygenase, encoded by BCO1
