= Vinyl resin =

Vinyl resin may refer to:

- Polyvinyl chloride, a synthetic plastic polymer
- Vinyl ester resin, also known as just "vinyl ester"
