= Codlemon =

Names
- IUPAC name (8E,10E)-dodeca-8,10-dien-1-ol
- Other names: Codlemone; Codlelure

Identifiers
CAS Number	33956-49-9
3D model (JSmol)	Interactive image
ChEMBL	ChEMBL3187120
ChemSpider	1403270
ECHA InfoCard	100.047.041
EC Number	251-761-2
PubChem CID	1787910
UNII	77N0YTO8YM
CompTox Dashboard (EPA)	DTXSID1035288
- InChI: InChI=1S/C12H22O/c1-2-3-4-5-6-7-8-9-10-11-12-13/h2-5,13H,6-12H2,1H3/b3-2+,5-4+ Key: CSWBSLXBXRFNST-MQQKCMAXSA-N
- SMILES: C/C=C/C=C/CCCCCCCO

Properties
Chemical formula	C_{12}H_{22}O
Molar mass	182.307 g·mol^{−1}
Density	0.86 g·cm^{−3}

Hazards
- GHS labelling
Pictograms	(GHS07: Exclamation mark) (GHS08: Health hazard) (GHS09: Environmental hazard)
Signal word	Danger
Hazard statements	H315, H317, H334, H410
Precautionary statements	P233, P260, P264, P271, P272, P273, P280, P284, P302+P352, P304+P340, P321, P333+P317, P342+P316, P362+P364, P391, P403, P501
- Except where otherwise noted, data are given for materials in their standard state (at 25 °C [77 °F], 100 kPa). Infobox references

Codlemon is a chemical compound belonging to the class of conjugated dienes.

== Occurrence ==
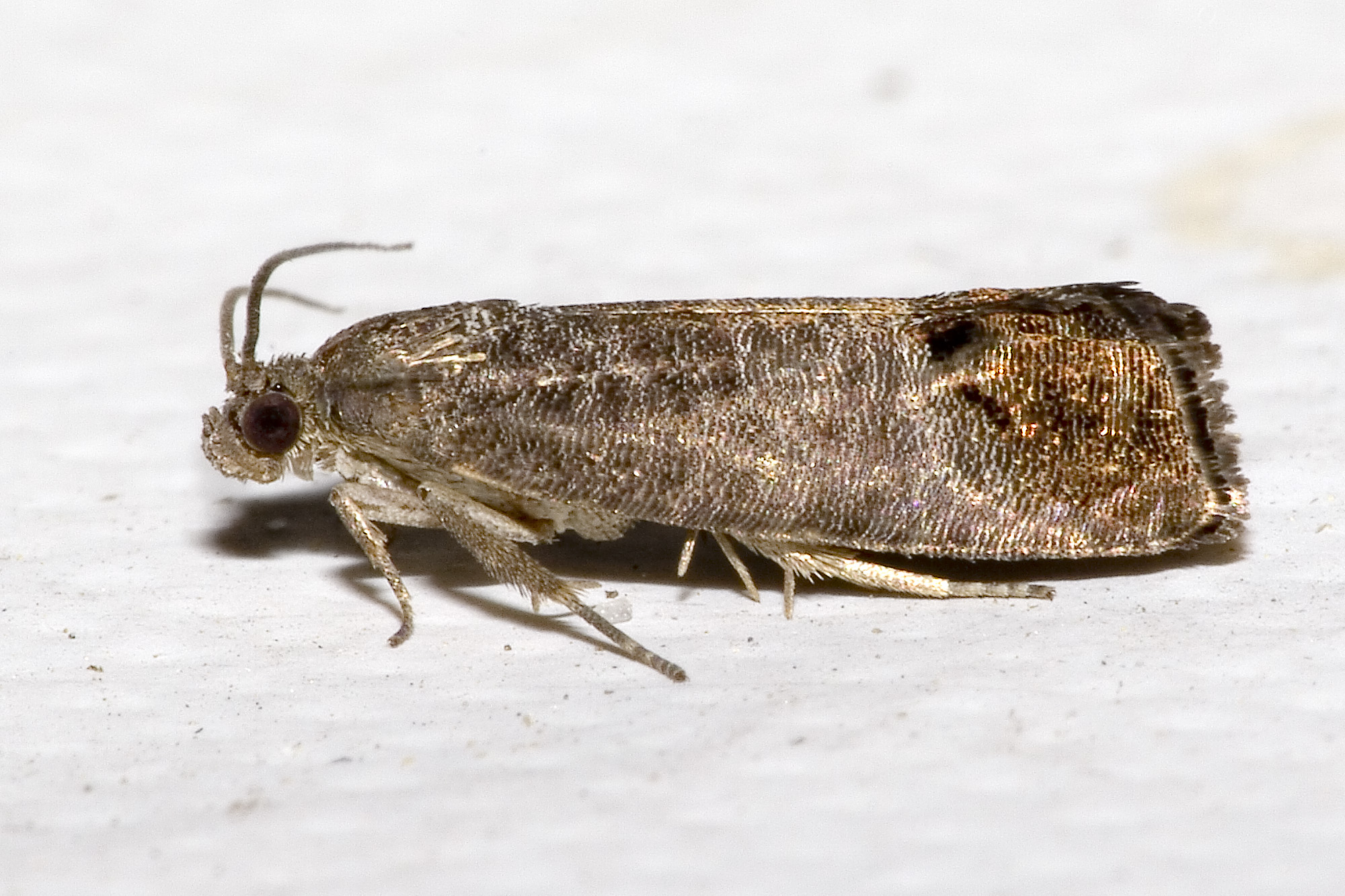
Codling moth (Cydia pomonella)

Codlemon is an insect pheromone that serves as the sex pheromone of the codling moth and Cydia caryana. It is used in pheromone traps for biological pest control.

== Approval ==
In the European Union, codlemon was approved as an attractant under the designation (E,E)-8,10-dodecadien-1-ol, effective September 1, 2009, alongside numerous other straight-chain butterfly pheromones.

Pesticide products containing this active substance are approved in several EU member states, including Germany and Austria, as well as in Switzerland.
