= 5-Methoxytryptophan =

Clinical data
- Other names: 5-MTP; 5-Methoxy-L-tryptophan; L-5-Methoxytryptophan; 5-MeO-tryptophan; α-Carboxy-5-methoxytryptamine; 5-Methoxy-α-carboxytryptamine; Cytoguardin
- ATC code: None

Identifiers
- IUPAC name: (2S)-2-amino-3-(5-methoxy-1H-indol-3-yl)propanoic acid
- CAS Number: 2504-22-5 25197-96-0
- PubChem CID: 151018
- ChemSpider: 106971
- UNII: 5B7WK2X4JP
- ChEBI: CHEBI:74049
- CompTox Dashboard (EPA): DTXSID50862973

Chemical and physical data
- Formula: C_{12}H_{14}N_{2}O_{3}
- Molar mass: 234.255 g·mol^{−1}
- 3D model (JSmol): Interactive image
- SMILES: COC1=CC2=C(C=C1)NC=C2C[C@@H](C(=O)O)N
- InChI: InChI=1S/C12H14N2O3/c1-17-8-2-3-11-9(5-8)7(6-14-11)4-10(13)12(15)16/h2-3,5-6,10,14H,4,13H2,1H3,(H,15,16)/t10-/m0/s1; Key:KVNPSKDDJARYKK-JTQLQIEISA-N

5-Methoxytryptophan (5-MTP), or 5-methoxy-L-tryptophan, also known as 5-methoxy-α-carboxytryptamine or as cytoguardin, is an endogenous metabolite of tryptophan with anti-inflammatory and anti-fibrotic effects. It is biosynthesized in two steps by tryptophan hydroxylase (TPH) and then by hydroxyindole O-methyltransferase (HIOMT), with 5-hydroxytryptophan (5-HTP) as a metabolic intermediate. 5-MTP is also a metabolic precursor of 5-methoxytryptamine. The compound promotes sleep in rodents similarly to melatonin. In contrast to melatonin, 5-MTP did not show affinity for melatonin receptors. It was first described in the scientific literature by at least 1951.

== See also ==
- Substituted tryptamine
