= Pencycuron =

Names
- Preferred IUPAC name N-[(4-Chlorophenyl)methyl]-N-cyclopentyl-N′-phenylurea

Identifiers
CAS Number	66063-05-6
3D model (JSmol)	Interactive image
ChEBI	CHEBI:7957
ChemSpider	82795
ECHA InfoCard	100.060.069
PubChem CID	91692
UNII	GCH2G449HP
CompTox Dashboard (EPA)	DTXSID3042261
- InChI: InChI=1S/C19H21ClN2O/c20-16-12-10-15(11-13-16)14-22(18-8-4-5-9-18)19(23)21-17-6-2-1-3-7-17/h1-3,6-7,10-13,18H,4-5,8-9,14H2,(H,21,23) Key: OGYFATSSENRIKG-UHFFFAOYSA-N; InChI=1/C19H21ClN2O/c20-16-12-10-15(11-13-16)14-22(18-8-4-5-9-18)19(23)21-17-6-2-1-3-7-17/h1-3,6-7,10-13,18H,4-5,8-9,14H2,(H,21,23) Key: OGYFATSSENRIKG-UHFFFAOYAF
- SMILES: Clc1ccc(cc1)CN(C(=O)Nc2ccccc2)C3CCCC3

Properties
Chemical formula	C_{19}H_{21}ClN_{2}O
Molar mass	328.84 g·mol^{−1}
- Except where otherwise noted, data are given for materials in their standard state (at 25 °C [77 °F], 100 kPa). Infobox references

Pencycuron is a phenylurea fungicide developed by Bayer Crop Science and marketed under the brand name Monceren. It has specific activity against the plant pathogen Rhizoctonia solani for which it was developed.
