= Pentethylcyclanone =

Chemical compound

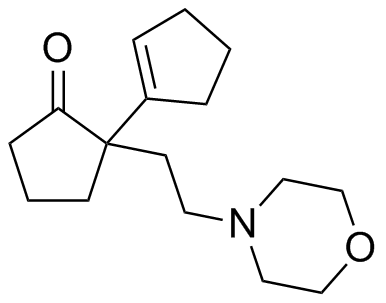

Clinical data
- Other names: Ciclexanona, cyclexanonum, cyclexanone

Identifiers
- IUPAC name: 2-(Cyclopenten-1-yl)-2-(2-morpholin-4-ylethyl)cyclopentan-1-one
- CAS Number: 15301-52-7
- PubChem CID: 10355398
- ChemSpider: 8530850
- UNII: 2OU4KS37EO
- CompTox Dashboard (EPA): DTXSID50934664

Chemical and physical data
- Formula: C_{16}H_{25}NO_{2}
- Molar mass: 263.381 g·mol^{−1}
- 3D model (JSmol): Interactive image
- SMILES: C1CC=C(C1)C2(CCCC2=O)CCN3CCOCC3
- InChI: InChI=1S/C16H25NO2/c18-15-6-3-7-16(15,14-4-1-2-5-14)8-9-17-10-12-19-13-11-17/h4H,1-3,5-13H2; Key:KUOYUNPLUMKQIF-UHFFFAOYSA-N

Pentethylcyclanone is an antitussive medication.

== Synthesis ==
Pentethylcyclanone can be prepared by alkylation of the anion of the self-condensation product of cyclopentanone with N-(2-chloroethyl)-morpholine.

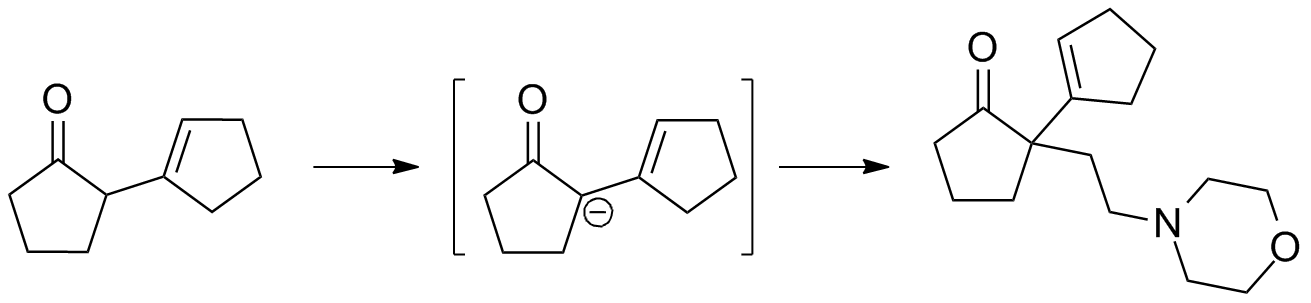
Cyclexanone synthesis
