= Cyclopentobarbital =

Chemical compound

Clinical data
- Other names: Allylpental, Cyclopental, 5-Allyl-5-Δ^{2}-Cyclopentenyl Barbituric Acid
- ATC code: None

Legal status
- Legal status: CA: Schedule IV

Identifiers
- IUPAC name: 5-(1-cyclopent-2-enyl)-5-prop-2-enyl-1,3- diazinane-2,4,6-trione
- CAS Number: 76-68-6 302-34-1 (sodium salt)
- PubChem CID: 6454
- ChemSpider: 6212
- UNII: 2230XWG55Q
- CompTox Dashboard (EPA): DTXSID90871549
- ECHA InfoCard: 100.000.891

Chemical and physical data
- Formula: C_{12}H_{14}N_{2}O_{3}
- Molar mass: 234.255 g·mol^{−1}
- 3D model (JSmol): Interactive image
- SMILES: O=C1NC(=O)NC(=O)C1(C2/C=C\CC2)C\C=C
- InChI: InChI=1S/C12H14N2O3/c1-2-7-12(8-5-3-4-6-8)9(15)13-11(17)14-10(12)16/h2-3,5,8H,1,4,6-7H2,(H2,13,14,15,16,17); Key:XOVJAYNMQDTIJD-UHFFFAOYSA-N

Cyclopentobarbital sodium (Cyclopal, Dormisan) is a barbiturate derivative invented in the 1940s. It has sedative and anticonvulsant properties, and was used primarily as an anaesthetic in veterinary medicine. Cyclopal is considered similar in effects to phenobarbital but lasts almost three times as long, and is considered a long-acting barbiturate with a fairly slow onset of action.

== See also ==
- Barbiturate
