= List of investigational acne drugs =

Investigational acne drugs

This is a list of investigational acne drugs, or drugs that are currently under development for clinical use in the treatment of acne but are not yet approved.

Chemical/generic names are listed first, with developmental code names, synonyms, and brand names in parentheses. The format of list items is "Name (Synonyms) – Mechanism of Action [Reference]".

This list was last comprehensively updated in September 2025. It is likely to become outdated with time.

== Under development ==
=== Phase 3 ===
- Benzoyl peroxide/tretinoin (IDP-120) – combination of benzoyl peroxide (undefined mechanism of action) and tretinoin (retinoid)
- Berdazimer sodium (SB-204; MAP3-NONOate; NVN1000) – nitric oxide releasing agent
- Denifanstat (ASC–40; TVB-2640) – fatty acid synthetase complex inhibitor
- GED 0507-34-Levo (GED-0507; GED-0507-34; N-acetyl-GED-0507-34; NAC-GED-0507) – peroxisome proliferator-activated receptor gamma (PPARγ) modulator

=== Phase 2/3 ===
- B-244 (AOB-101; AOB-102; AOB-103; AOB-201; AOB-202; AOB-203; B244; nitrosomonas eutropha D23) – bacteria replacement

=== Phase 2 ===
- Acetylcysteine lysinate (L-lysine-N-acetyl-L-cysteinate; N-acetylcysteine lysinate; Nacystelyn) – antioxidant
- Aminolevulinic acid (ALA; BF-200 ALA) – photosensitizer
- Cannabidiol topical (CBD; BTX-1204; BTX-1308; BTX-1503; BTX-1702; BTX-1801; PBX-1308) – cannabinoid
- Dimethylcurcumin (ASCJ-9; AJ-101; ASC-J9) – androgen receptor degradation enhancer
- Imsidolimab (ANB-019) – monoclonal antibody against the interleukin-36 receptor
- Ivermectin topical (CD-5024; Soolantra) – non-mammalian chloride channel opener
- LYS-006 – leukotriene A4 hydrolase (LTA4H) inhibitor
- Methyl aminolevulinate (MAL; CD06809-41; Luxerm; MAL-PDT; Metvix; Metvixia; P-1202; Visonac) – photosensitizer
- NAI Acne (BI-Acne; BI-K-0376; CB-06-01; CB-06-04; NAI-003; NAI-Acne; VIC-acne) – peptide elongation factor Tu inhibitor
- Omiganan (CLS-001; CPI-226; MBI-226; MBI-594AN; MX-226; MX-594AN; Omigard) – antiseptic/antibacterial
- Pyrilutamide (EX-A5504; HY-145451; KX–826) – antiandrogen (androgen receptor antagonist)
- Tretinoin topical – retinoid (retinoic acid receptor agonist)
- VB-1953 – antibiotic and toll-like receptor antagonist

=== Phase 1/2 ===
- Aminolevulinic acid (ALA) – photosensitizer
- SP-0268 (acne mRNA vaccine) – immunostimulant, vaccine

=== Phase 1 ===
- AMTX-100 – transcription factor modulator
- ASC-60 (TVB-3567) – fatty acid synthetase complex inhibitor
- Trifarotene – retinoic acid receptor gamma (RAR-γ) agonist

=== Preclinical ===
- Acne vaccine – immunostimulant
- ADA-308 – antiandrogen (androgen receptor antagonist)
- Research programme: acne vulgaris therapeutics - Attillaps Pharmaceuticals – acetylcholinesterase inhibitors

=== Research ===
- Topical acne vulgaris therapeutic (novel compound 8) – undefined mechanism of action

== Not under development ==
=== No development reported ===
- Adapalene/minocycline (FCD-105) – combination of adapalene (retinoid) and minocycline (tetracycline antibiotic)
- Auriclosene (AgaDerm; AgaNase; AL-46383A; CD-07223; DCDMT; NVC-422) – aganocide compound and antimicrobial
- Bermekimab (CA-18C3; CV-18C3; Hutruo; JNJ-77474462; MAB-p1; RA-18C3; T2-18C3; Xilonix) – monoclonal antibody against interleukin-1α
- BOS-356 (GSK-3008356) – diacylglycerol O-acyltransferase inhibitor
- Brilacidin (PMX-30063) – host defense protein (HDP) mimetic antibiotic
- Carbamide peroxide topical (E-0301) – disinfectant and bleaching agent
- CJM-112 – IL17A and IL17F inhibitor
- Clindamycin/tretinoin – combination of clindamycin (lincosamide antibiotic) and tretinoin (retinoid)
- Clindamycin/tretinoin – combination of clindamycin (lincosamide antibiotic) and tretinoin (retinoid)
- DMT-200 (DMT-210; DMT-220; SIG-990) – isoprenylcysteine analogue and various actions
- Estradiol valerate/dienogest (Climodien; Climodiène; Klimodien; Lafamme) – combination of estradiol valerate (estrogen) and dienogest (progestogen)
- Ethinylestradiol/chlormadinone acetate (Balianca; Belara; GRT4248) – combination of ethinylestradiol (estrogen) and chlormadinone acetate (progestogen) and a combined oral contraceptive
- Ethinylestradiol/drospirenone (Petibelle; SH-470; Yasmin; ZK-30595) – combination of ethinylestradiol (estrogen) and drospirenone (progestogen)
- GSK-1940029 – stearoyl-CoA desaturase inhibitor
- GT-20029 (AR-PROTAC) – androgen receptor degradation enhancer
- IP10-C8 – CD13 antigen inhibitor and dipeptidyl peptidase 4 (DPP4) inhibitor
- Minocycline extended release (Emrosi; Ximino) – tetracycline antibiotic
- Minocycline topical (HY01) – tetracycline antibiotic
- MTC-896 – melanocortin receptor antagonist
- Nitric oxide (Enovid; FabiSpray; NORS-0791; NORS-1002; NORS-2791; NORS-4002; NORS-6491; NORS) – nitric oxide donor
- ORG-101 (acne vulgaris vaccine; ORI-001; ORI-A-ce001) – immunostimulant, vaccine
- Radezolid (RX-01667; Rx-01_667; RX-103; RX-1741) – oxazolidone antibiotic
- Research programme: antimicrobial therapies - NovaBiotics – cell membrane permeability enhancers
- Research programme: synthetic cannabinoid therapeutics - Claritas Pharmaceuticals – cannabinoids (cannabinoid receptor modulators)
- Research programme: therapeutic antibody fragments - Kuur Therapeutics – various actions
- Silver dihydrogen citrate (SDC; Axenohl) – antiseptic/antibacterial
- Tazarotene topical (DFD-03) – retinoid X receptor agonist

=== Discontinued ===
- Acebilustat (CTX-4430; EP-501) – leukotriene A4 (LTA4H) hydrolase inhibitor
- Afamelanotide (CUV-1647; EPT-1647; Melanotan I; Melanotan; Prenumbra; Scenesse) – melanocortin receptor agonist
- BBI-3000 – retinoid X receptor agonist
- BMX-010 (MnTE-2-PyP) – reactive oxygen species (ROS) scavenger and radioprotector
- Botulinum toxin A liquid (AI-09) – acetylcholine release inhibitor and neuromuscular blocking agent
- Botulinum toxin A topical (ANT-1207) – acetylcholine release inhibitor and neuromuscular blocking agent
- Cioteronel (CPC-10997; Cyoctol; X-Andron) – antiandrogen (androgen receptor antagonist)
- Diroleuton (DGLA; DHLA; DS-107; RO-12-1989) – omega-6 fatty acid and anti-inflammatory
- DMVT-503 (RVT-503) – undefined mechanism of action
- DX-0385 – retinoic acid metabolism modulator
- Encapsulated tretinoin cream – retinoid (retinoic acid receptor agonist)
- Epristeride (Aipuliete; ONO-9302; SKF-105657) – 5α-reductase inhibitor
- Falecalcitriol (DSC-103; F6VD3; flocalcitriol; Fulstan; hexafluorocalcitriol; hexafluorovitamin D3; Hornel; SM-8000; ST-630) – vitamin D/calcitriol analogue
- Gevokizumab (S-78989; VPM-087; XMA-005.2) – monoclonal antibody against interleukin-1β
- Hypochlorous acid (PR-013; PR-022) – disinfectant and other actions
- Imsidolimab (ANB-019) – monoclonal antibody against the interleukin-36 receptor
- Incyclinide (chemically modified tetracycline 3; CMT-3; COL-3; Metastat) – chemically modified tetracycline and matrix metalloproteinase inhibitor (no antibiotic activity)
- Ingenol disoxate (LEO-43204) – undefined mechanism of action
- JNJ-10229570 – melanocortin MC_{5} receptor antagonist
- MDI-301 – undefined mechanism of action
- MK-434 (MK-0434) – 5α-reductase inhibitor
- MTCH-24 (Zilex; Zorex) – undefined mechanism of action
- PF-06423264 – acetyl-CoA carboxylase inhibitor
- PSK-3841 (HMR-3841; RU-58841) – antiandrogen (androgen receptor antagonist)
- Research programme: acne therapeutics - Praxis – undefined mechanism of action
- Research programme: tetracycline derivatives - Paratek Pharmaceuticals (P-004292) – tetracycline derivatives
- Rose bengal sodium (PH-10; Provecta; PV-10; rose bengal; Xantryl) – immunomodulator and other actions
- Santalum album ointment (albuterpenoid; East Indian sandalwood oil) – undefined mechanism of action
- Talarozole (R115866; Rambazole) – retinoic acid metabolism modulator
- Thykamine (PCT-233; PUR-0110) – undefined mechanism of action (anti-inflammatory)
- Valproic acid topical (Avugane; Baceca; G2M-777) – histone deacetylase inhibitor and other actions
- XEN-801 (XEN801) – stearoyl-CoA desaturase inhibitor
- XOMA-629 (XMP-629) – endotoxin inhibitor
- Zileuton (A-64077; Abbott-64077; ABT-077; CRTX-073; CTI-02; Zyflo) – 5-lipoxygenase inhibitor

=== Not under development ===
- Isotretinoin topical – retinoid (retinoic acid receptor agonist)

== Clinically used drugs ==
=== Approved drugs ===
==== Single-drug formulations ====
- Adapalene (CD-271; Differin) – retinoid (retinoic acid receptor agonist)
- Azelaic acid (BAY39-6251; Finacea; Skinoren) – undefined mechanism of action
- Benzoyl peroxide (Bepio; M6050; M605101) – undefined mechanism of action
- Clascoterone (Breezula; Winlevi; CB-03-01; cortexolone 17α-propionate) – antiandrogen (androgen receptor antagonist)
- Clindamycin (ResiDerm A; Zindaclin) – lincosamide antibiotic
- Dapsone topical (Aczone; Atrisone) – sulfone antibiotic
- Doxycycline hyclate (Acticlate; Monodox; AQ101) – tetracycline antibiotic
- Isotretinoin (Absorica; Accutane; CIP-isotretinoin; Epuris; Lisacne-CIP) – retinoid (retinoic acid receptor agonist)
- Minocycline (DFD-10; DFD-29; Emrosi; Minolira) – tetracycline antibiotic
- Minocycline foam (Amzeeq; FMX-102; FMX-103; FMX-101; FXFM-244; Zilxi) – tetracycline antibiotic
- Nadifloxacin topical – fluoroquinolone antibiotic
- Ozenoxacin (Dubine; GF-001001-00; M-5120; M-512101; M-512102; Ozadub; Ozanex; T-3912; Xepi; Zebiax) – quinolone antibiotic
- Sarecycline (Seysara; P-0005672; WC-3035) – narrow-spectrum tetracycline antibiotic
- Solubilised benzoyl peroxide (CLENZIderm M.D.; SoluCLENZ Rx Gel) – undefined mechanism of action
- Tazarotene topical (AGN-190299; Avage; Fabior; Suretin; Tazorac; Zorac) – retinoid (retinoic acid receptor agonist)
- Tretinoin (Acnisdin Retinoico; All-trans retinoic acid; Arotinoid; Avita; Dermojuventus; Loderm Retinoico; NSC 122758; Retinoic acid; Retirides; Vesanoid; Vitamin A acid; Vitamin-A Acid; Vitanol) – retinoid (retinoic acid receptor agonist)
- Tretinoin lotion (Altreno; IDP-121) – retinoid (retinoic acid receptor agonist)
- Trifarotene (Aklief; CD-5789) – retinoid acid receptor gamma (RAR-γ) agonist

==== Combination formulations ====
- Adapalene/benzoyl peroxide (CD-0271/CD-1579; Epiduo; GK-530G; Tactuo; TactuPump) – combination of adapalene (retinoid) and benzoyl peroxide (undefined mechanism of action)
- Adapalene/benzoyl peroxide/clindamycin phosphate (Cabtreo; IDP-126) – combination of adapalene (retinoid), benzoyl peroxide (undefined mechanism of action), and clindamycin phosphate (lincosamide antibiotic)
- Benzoyl peroxide/clindamycin (Duac) – combination of benzoyl peroxide (undefined mechanism of action) and clindamycin (lincosamide antibiotic)
- Benzoyl peroxide/clindamycin low dose (Acanya; BenzaClin; Clin-BPO; Onexton) – combination of benzoyl peroxide (undefined mechanism of action) and clindamycin (lincosamide antibiotic)
- Benzoyl peroxide/tretinoin – combination of benzoyl peroxide (undefined mechanism of action) and tretinoin (retinoid)
- Clindamycin/tretinoin (Acnatac; Acnex; CLin-RA; Ziana) – combination of clindamycin (lincosamide antibiotic) and tretinoin (retinoid)
- Ethinylestradiol/drospirenone low-dose (Yasmin, Yaz) – combination of ethinylestradiol (estrogen) and drospirenone (progestogen) and a combined oral contraceptive
- Ethinylestradiol/drospirenone/levomefolic acid (BAY98-7071; Beyaz; Safyral; Yasmin Plus; Yaz Flex Plus; Yaz Plus) – combination of ethinylestradiol (estrogen), drospirenone (progestogen), and levomefolic acid (vitamin B_{9}) and a combined oral contraceptive

=== Off-label drugs ===
- Antihistamines (histamine H_{1} receptor antagonists) (e.g., cetirizine, desloratadine, fexofenadine, levocetirizine, loratadine)
- Corticosteroids (corticosteroid receptor agonists) (e.g., hydrocortisone, prednisone, triamcinolone acetonide)
- Hydroquinone – tyrosinase inhibitor and skin-lightening agent
- Nicotinamide (niacinamide) – vitamin B_{3}
- Oral antiandrogens (androgen receptor antagonists) (e.g., spironolactone, cyproterone acetate, flutamide, bicalutamide, ketoconazole, cimetidine)
- Other antibiotics (e.g., erythromycin, metronidazole, sulfacetamide)
- Other ethinylestradiol-containing combined oral contraceptives
- Salicylic acid – various actions (keratolytic, comedolytic, and bacteriostatic)
- Zinc – undefined mechanism of action (antibacterial and anti-inflammatory)

== See also ==
- List of investigational drugs
- List of investigational hair loss drugs
