= Clindamycin/tretinoin =

Combination drug

Combination of
- Clindamycin phosphate: Antibiotic
- Tretinoin: Topical retinoid

Clinical data
- Trade names: Ziana, others
- MedlinePlus: a609005
- Routes of administration: Topical
- ATC code: D10AD51 (WHO)

Legal status
- Legal status: In general: ℞ (Prescription only)

Identifiers
- CAS Number: 337954-93-5
- KEGG: D11084

Clindamycin/tretinoin is a topical gel used in the treatment of acne. The two active ingredients are the antibiotic clindamycin phosphate (1.2%) and tretinoin (0.025%), a retinoid. The two active ingredients perform different functions, the clindamycin is active against gram-positive bacteria, including streptococci and penicillin-resistant staphylococci. The Tretinoin element acts to reduce the amount of oil released by oil glands in skin, as well as encouraging skin cell replenishment. The topical treatment is stored in 2, 30, and 60 gram tubes and should be stored at 25°C (77°F), with the tube tightly shut away from light. Side effects may include peeling, redness, dryness, itching and photosensitivity. Also, topical clindamycin may rarely cause diarrhea or colitis. Sun exposure while using this preparation can cause skin irritation.
