= Minocycline =

Antibiotic medication

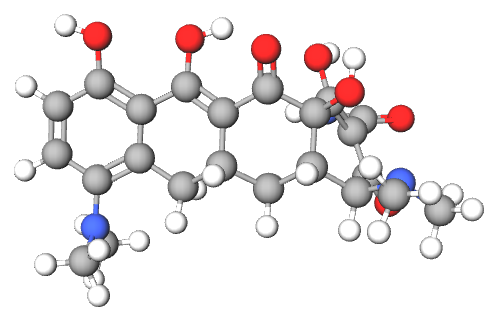

Clinical data
- Trade names: Minocin, others
- AHFS/Drugs.com: Monograph
- MedlinePlus: a682101
- License data: US DailyMed: Minocycline
- Pregnancy category: AU: D
- Routes of administration: By mouth, intravenous, topical
- Drug class: Antibiotic; Tetracycline antibiotic
- ATC code: J01AA08 (WHO) A01AB23 (WHO), D10AF07 (WHO)

Legal status
- Legal status: AU: S4 (Prescription only); US: ℞-only

Pharmacokinetic data
- Bioavailability: 90–100%
- Protein binding: 70–75%
- Metabolism: Liver
- Elimination half-life: 15.5 h (11–26 h)
- Excretion: Mostly fecal, 10–15% renal

Identifiers
- IUPAC name: (2E,4S,4aR,5aS,12aR)-2-(Amino-hydroxy-methylidene)-4,7-bis(dimethylamino)-10,11,12a-trihydroxy-4a,5,5a,6- tetrahydro-4H-tetracene-1,3,12-trione
- CAS Number: 10118-90-8
- PubChem CID: 54675783
- DrugBank: DB01017
- ChemSpider: 16735907
- UNII: FYY3R43WGO
- KEGG: D05045
- ChEBI: CHEBI:50694
- ChEMBL: ChEMBL1434
- CompTox Dashboard (EPA): DTXSID1045033
- ECHA InfoCard: 100.226.626

Chemical and physical data
- Formula: C_{23}H_{27}N_{3}O_{7}
- Molar mass: 457.483 g·mol^{−1}
- 3D model (JSmol): Interactive image
- Specific rotation: $[\alpha]_D^{25}$ = −166°
- Solubility in water: Low
- SMILES: CN(C)c1ccc(c2c1C[C@H]3C[C@H]4[C@@H](C(=C(C(=O)[C@]4(C(=C3C2=O)O)O)C(=O)N)O)N(C)C)O
- InChI: InChI=1S/C23H27N3O7/c1-25(2)12-5-6-13(27)15-10(12)7-9-8-11-17(26(3)4)19(29)16(22(24)32)21(31)23(11,33)20(30)14(9)18(15)28/h5-6,9,11,17,27,29-30,33H,7-8H2,1-4H3,(H2,24,32)/t9-,11-,17-,23-/m0/s1; Key:DYKFCLLONBREIL-KVUCHLLUSA-N

Minocycline, sold under the brand name Minocin among others, is a tetracycline antibiotic medication used to treat a number of bacterial infections such as some occurring in certain forms of pneumonia. It is generally (but not always) less preferred than the tetracycline doxycycline. Minocycline is also used for the treatment of acne and rheumatoid arthritis. It is taken by mouth or applied to the skin.

Common side effects include nausea, diarrhea, dizziness, allergic reactions, and kidney problems. Serious side effects may include anaphylaxis, a lupus-like syndrome, and easy sunburning. Use in the later part of pregnancy may harm the baby and safety during breastfeeding is unclear. It works by decreasing a bacterium's ability to make protein thus stopping its growth.

Minocycline was patented in 1961 and came into commercial use in 1971. It is available as a generic medication. In 2022, it was the 269th most commonly prescribed medication in the United States, with more than 900,000 prescriptions.

== Medical uses ==
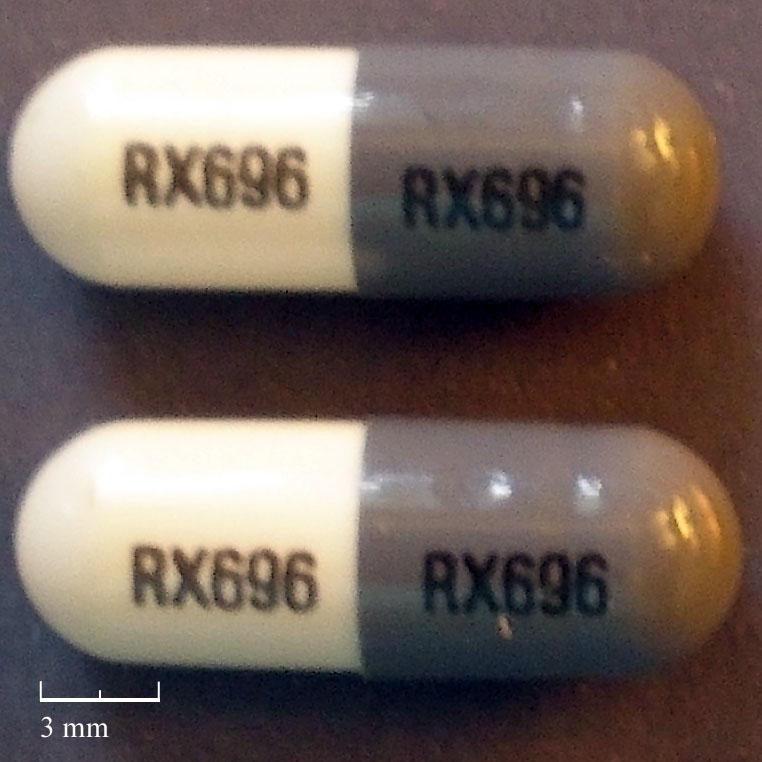
Minocycline 100-mg capsules manufactured by Ranbaxy Pharmaceuticals

=== Acne ===
Minocycline and doxycycline are frequently used for the treatment of acne vulgaris. Minocycline is specifically indicated to treat inflammatory lesions of non-nodular moderate to severe acne vulgaris in people nine years of age and older. Both minocycline and doxycycline have similar levels of effectiveness and common adverse effects for acne, although doxycycline may have a slightly lower risk of adverse side effects. Both oral/systemic and more recently topical formulations of minocycline are available to treat acne.

Historically, oral minocycline has been an effective treatment for acne vulgaris. However, acne that is caused by antibiotic-resistant bacteria is a growing problem in many countries. In Europe and North America, a number of people with acne no longer respond well to treatment with tetracycline family antibiotics because their acne symptoms are caused by bacteria (primarily Cutibacterium acnes) that are resistant to these antibiotics. In order to reduce resistance rates as well as increase the effectiveness of treatment, oral antibiotics should be generally combined with topical acne creams such as benzoyl peroxide or a retinoid (tretinoin, adapalene, etc.). There have also been concerns about systemic minocycline having a variety of rare adverse effects in terms of its use to treat acne.

Oral minocycline is used to treat acne for up to 3 to 4 months. Data beyond 3 to 4 months are limited.

=== Other infections ===
Minocycline is also used for other skin infections such as methicillin-resistant Staphylococcus aureus.

Although minocycline's broader spectrum of activity, compared with other members of the group, includes activity against Neisseria meningitidis, its use for prophylaxis is no longer recommended because of side effects (dizziness and vertigo).

It may be used to treat certain strains of methicillin-resistant S. aureus infection and a disease caused by drug-resistant Acinetobacter spp.

A list of uses includes:

- Amoebic dysentery
- Anthrax
- Bubonic plague
- Cholera
- Ehrlichiosis
- Gonorrhea (when penicillin cannot be given)
- Gougerot-Carteaud syndrome (confluent and reticulated papillomatosis)
- Hidradenitis suppurativa
- For use as an adjuvant to HAART
- Leprosy
- Periodontal disease
- Perioral dermatitis
- Respiratory infections such as pneumonia
- Rocky Mountain spotted fever
- Rosacea
- Shigellosis
- Syphilis (when penicillin cannot be given)
- Urinary tract infections (UTIs), rectal infections, and infections of the cervix caused by certain microbes

Minocycline has been reported to be effective in the eradication of UTIs and prostatitis. A 2013 Cochrane review identified and included two comparative clinical trials of minocycline for chronic bacterial prostatitis. For this condition, minocycline has been found to be equivalent or superior to doxycycline, equivalent to trimethoprim/sulfamethoxazole, and superior to the first-generation cephalosporin cephalexin. It was also equivalent to the fluoroquinolone ofloxacin in the treatment of chronic bacterial prostatitis caused by Ureaplasma urealyticum. Treatment durations of minocycline for chronic bacterial prostatitis have ranged from 2 to 4 weeks.

=== Available forms ===
Minocycline is available in the form of 50 and 100 mg oral capsules, among a variety of other formulations. The oral form of minocycline is usually taken twice daily, once every 12 hours, although divided doses four times daily can also be employed. Extended-release oral forms are also available. A topical formulation is available as well.

== Contraindications ==
The drug is contraindicated in people with known hypersensitivity to tetracycline antibiotics, as there is complete cross sensitivity in this group. It is also contraindicated in people with severe liver impairment and after the 16th week of pregnancy.

== Side effects ==
Minocycline may cause upset stomach, diarrhea, dizziness, unsteadiness, drowsiness, mouth sores, migraines, and vomiting. It increases sensitivity to sunlight, and may affect the quality of sleep and rarely causes sleep disorders. It has also been linked to cases of lupus. Prolonged use of minocycline can lead to blue-gray staining of skin, fingernails, and scar tissue. This staining is not permanent, but can take a very long time for the skin color to return to normal; however, a muddy brown skin color in sun-exposed areas is usually permanent. Permanent blue discoloration of gums or teeth discoloration may also occur. Rare but serious side effects include fever, yellowing of the eyes or skin, stomach pain, sore throat, vision changes, and mental changes, including depersonalization.

Occasionally, minocycline therapy may result in autoimmune disorders such as drug-related lupus and autoimmune hepatitis, which usually occurs in men who also developed minocycline-induced lupus; however, women are more likely to develop minocycline-induced lupus. Significant or complete recovery occurs in most people who develop minocycline-induced autoimmune problems within a period of a few weeks to a year of cessation of minocycline therapy. Autoimmune problems emerge during chronic therapy, but can sometimes occur after only short courses of a couple of weeks of therapy. Drug reaction with eosinophilia and systemic symptoms (DRESS) syndrome can occur during the first few weeks of therapy with minocycline.

Minocycline, but not other tetracyclines, can cause vestibular disturbances, including symptoms of dizziness, ataxia, vertigo, and tinnitus. These effects are thought to be related to minocycline's greater penetration into the central nervous system. The vestibular side effects are much more common in women than in men, reportedly occurring in 50 to 70% of women receiving minocycline. However, other sources state that vestibular side effects occur in only 1 to 10% of patients. In any case, other studies have found that side effects occur more frequently in women than in men (~58% vs. 34%, respectively). Due to its vestibular side effects, minocycline has been said to be rarely used in female patients. Minocycline's vestibular side effects typically resolve after discontinuation of the drug.

Symptoms of an allergic reaction include rash, itching, swelling, severe dizziness, and trouble breathing. Minocycline has also been reported to very rarely cause idiopathic intracranial hypertension (pseudotumor cerebri), a side effect also more common in female patients, potentially leading to permanent vision damage if not recognized early and treated.

Contrary to most other tetracycline antibiotics (doxycycline excluded), minocycline may be used in those with kidney disease, but may aggravate systemic lupus erythematosus. It may also trigger or unmask autoimmune hepatitis.

Minocycline can cause the rare condition of secondary intracranial hypertension, which has initial symptoms of headache, visual disturbances, dizziness, vomiting, and confusion. Brain swelling and rheumatoid arthritis are rare side effects of minocycline in some people.

Minocycline, like most tetracyclines, becomes dangerous past its expiration date. While most prescription drugs lose potency after their expiration dates, tetracyclines are known to become toxic over time. Expired tetracyclines can cause serious damage to the kidney due to the formation of a degradation product, anhydro-4-epitetracycline. Minocycline's absorption is impaired if taken at the same time of day as calcium or iron supplements. Unlike some of the other tetracycline group antibiotics, it can be taken with calcium-rich foods such as milk, although this does reduce the absorption slightly.

Minocycline, like other tetracyclines, is associated with esophageal irritation and ulceration if insufficient fluids are taken with the drug before sleep.

A 2007 study suggested that minocycline harms amyotrophic lateral sclerosis (ALS) patients. Patients on minocycline declined more rapidly than those on placebo. The mechanism of this side effect is unknown, although a hypothesis is that the drug exacerbated an autoimmune component of the primary disease. The effect does not seem to be dose-dependent because the patients on high doses did not do worse than those on the low doses.

Other possible rare side effects of minocycline include hyperpigmentation and hypersensitivity reactions, among others. It has been associated with more rare and serious adverse effects than other tetracyclines. Some of the rare adverse effects of minocycline may result in death. This has spurred interest in topical instead of systemic minocycline for treatment of acne.

Minocycline is another drug known to cause leukopenia.[source? Known by whom?]

Minocycine has shown thyroid toxicity in animals, including in rodents, mini pigs, dogs, and monkeys.

The use of minocycline to treat acne has been associated with skin and gut dysbiosis (see antibiotic misuse).

== Overdose ==
Symptoms of minocycline overdose may include dizziness, nausea, and vomiting. There is no specific antidote for overdose of minocycline and treatment should be symptom-based and supportive. The drug is not removed by hemodialysis or peritoneal dialysis.

== Interactions ==
The combination of minocycline with dairy, antacids, calcium and magnesium supplements, iron products, laxatives containing magnesium, or bile acid sequestrants may decrease minocycline's effectiveness by forming chelates. Combining it with isotretinoin, acitretin or other retinoids can increase the risk for intracranial hypertension. Minocycline significantly reduces concentrations of the anti-HIV drug atazanavir in the body.

== Pharmacology ==
=== Pharmacodynamics ===
==== Antibiotic activity ====
Minocycline mediates its antibiotic activity by binding to the 30S ribosomal subunit of bacteria and thereby inhibiting protein synthesis. It is primarily bacteriostatic. The drug is a broad-spectrum antibiotic and shows activity against a wide range of both Gram-positive and Gram-negative bacteria.

==== Other activities ====
Minocycline shows a number of off-target activities in addition to its antibiotic activity. These include inhibition of matrix metalloproteinases (MMPs), anti-inflammatory effects, antiapoptotic effects, antioxidant effects, and neuroprotective effects.

Some other reported activities of minocycline include:

- PARP1 inhibition K_{i} = 13.8 nM
- Neuroprotection IC_{50} = 10 nM
- Microglia full inhibition = 20 nM
- Suppression of the mouse's locomotor activity = 0.5 mg/kg
- Indirect inhibition of inducible nitric oxide synthase

=== Pharmacokinetics ===
==== Absorption ====
Minocycline is quickly and nearly completely absorbed from the upper part of the small intestine. Taking it together with food, including milk, has no relevant influence on resorption. It reaches highest blood plasma concentrations after 1 to 2 hours.

==== Distribution ====
The drug has a plasma protein binding of 70 to 75%. It penetrates into almost all tissues; very high concentrations are found in the gallbladder and liver. It crosses the blood–brain barrier better than doxycycline and other tetracyclines, reaching therapeutically relevant concentrations in the cerebrospinal fluid and also in inflamed meninges. Minocycline achieves good concentrations in the urinary bladder, and many other tissues. It shows excellent penetration into the prostate gland. However, while permeation of prostate tissue and semen is good, levels are lower in prostatic fluid.

==== Metabolism ====
Minocycline is inactivated by metabolism in the liver to about 50%. It is primarily metabolized into 9-hydroxyminocycline. Two N-demethylated metabolites are also formed.

==== Elimination ====
The rest is predominantly excreted into the gut (in part via the gallbladder, in part directly from blood vessels) and eliminated via the feces. About 10–15% are eliminated via the kidneys. It is excreted about 5 to 10% unchanged in urine. For comparison, other tetracyclines, like doxycycline and tetracycline, are excreted 30 to 70% unchanged in urine. The biological half-life of minocycline is 11 to 26 hours in healthy people, up to 30 hours in those with kidney failure, and significantly longer in those with liver disease.

== Chemistry ==
Minocycline is a tetracycline derivative. It is closely structurally related to other tetracyclic antibiotics such as tetracycline, doxycycline, and tigecycline.

The drug is used in form of minocycline hydrochloride dihydrate, which is sparingly soluble in water and slightly soluble in ethanol. Minocycline reacts acidic in aqueous solution.

The partition coefficient (P) of minocycline has been reported to be 39.4 (i.e., log P of 1.60). However, other sources have stated the experimental log P of minocycline to be 0.05, 0.5, and 1.1. In any case, minocycline is consistently described as a highly lipophilic compound with excellent tissue penetration and distribution. It has been said to be unique among the tetracyclines in that it is the most lipophilic of all of the members of this group. Minocycline has 10 to 30 times greater lipophilicity than tetracycline and 5 times greater lipophilicity than doxycycline. The improved lipophilicity of minocycline is thought to be advantageous in terms of its clinical antibiotic effectiveness.

== History ==
Minocycline was patented in 1961, was first described in the scientific literature in 1967, and came into commercial use in 1971. A topical foam for treatment of acne was approved in 2019.

== Society and culture ==
=== Brand names ===
- Minomycin
- Minostad (in Europe, for the treatment of acne)
- Akamin
- Minocin
- Minoderm
- Cyclimycin
- Arestin (1-mg doses administered locally into periodontal pockets, after scaling and root planing, for treatment of periodontal disease.)
- Nomika (in Indonesia)
- Aknemin
- Solodyn (extended-release, for the treatment of acne)
- Dynacin
- Sebomin
- Mino-Tabs
- Acnamino
- Minopen (in Japan)
- Maracyn 2 (for treatment of bacterial infections in aquarium fish and amphibians)
- Quatrocin (in Syria)
- Minox (in Ireland)
- Minoz (in India and Romania)
- Divaine (in India)
- Vinocyclin 100 (100-mg dose approved for treatment of acne in Vietnam)
- Dentomycin (2% minocylcine gel for use in periodontal pockets)
- Amzeeq (4% foam, approved for treatment of acne United States)
- Zilxi (1.5% foam, approved for treatment of rosacea in the United States)
- Cleeravue-M

=== Generic availability ===
It is available as a generic medication.

== Research ==
=== Neuropsychiatric disorders ===
==== Depression ====
Minocycline has been studied in the treatment of depression. According to a 2023 systematic review of minocycline for treatment-resistant depression based on four clinical trials, "There is no significant difference with minocycline compared to placebo for depression not responding to first-line antidepressant therapy." Likewise, a 2025 systematic review and meta-analysis of four randomized controlled trials found that minocycline was not significantly more effective than placebo in treating depression. Minocycline might have some benefit in treatment-resistant depression with inflammation however. Yet another meta-analysis, also published in 2023, found that minocycline was effective in the treatment of depression, including treatment-resistant depression, with a small to moderate effect size.

==== Schizophrenia ====
Early research has found a tentative benefit from minocycline in schizophrenia, with several trials underway as of 2012. A 2014 meta-analysis found minocycline may reduce negative and total symptom scores and was well tolerated. A 2019 meta-analysis, which included 13 randomized controlled trials, found that minocycline was effective in the treatment of the positive, negative, and general symptoms of schizophrenia, with small to moderate effect sizes. Similarly, a 2023 systematic review and meta-analysis of 10 randomized controlled trials found that minocycline was effective in treating the total, negative, and general symptoms of schizophrenia but not the positive or cognitive symptoms, again with small to moderate effect sizes.

==== Other conditions ====
Some early studies suggest that minocycline may be beneficial as an add-on treatment for moderate-to-severe obsessive-compulsive disorder (OCD) when used with a selective serotonin reuptake inhibitor (SSRI).

=== Stroke and neurodegenerative diseases ===
In ongoing research and trial, minocycline demonstrated efficacy and seems a promising neuroprotective agent in acute stroke patients, especially in AIS subgroup. Further RCTs are needed to evaluate the efficacy and safety of minocycline among ICH patients.

Research is examining the possible neuroprotective and anti-inflammatory effects of minocycline against the progression of a group of neurodegenerative disorders including multiple sclerosis, rheumatoid arthritis, Huntington's disease, and Parkinson's disease. As mentioned above, minocycline harms ALS patients.

A trial found no difference between minocycline and placebo in people with Alzheimer's disease. Minocycline is somewhat neuroprotective in mouse models of Huntington's disease.

=== Multiple sclerosis ===
A 2007 study reported the impact of the antibiotic minocycline on clinical and magnetic resonance imaging (MRI) outcomes and serum immune molecules in 40 MS patients over 24 months of open-label minocycline treatment. Despite a moderately high pretreatment relapse rate in the patient group prior to treatment (1.3/year pre-enrollment; 1.2/year during a three-month baseline period), no relapses occurred between months 6 and 24 on minocycline. Also, despite significant MRI disease-activity pretreatment (19/40 scans had gadolinium-enhancing activity during a three-month run-in), the only patient with gadolinium-enhancing lesions on MRI at 12 and 24 months was on half-dose minocycline. Levels of interleukin-12 (IL-12), which at high levels might antagonize the proinflammatory IL-12 receptor, were elevated over 18 months of treatment, as were levels of soluble vascular cell adhesion molecule-1 (VCAM-1). The activity of matrix metalloproteinase-9 was decreased by treatment. Clinical and MRI outcomes in this study were supported by systemic immunological changes and call for further investigation of minocycline in MS.

=== Delirium ===
A 2024 randomized controlled trial found that prophylactic minocycline provided a small but significant decrease in delirium incidence in critically ill patients. Unexpectedly, there was also a significant decrease in hospital mortality with minocycline prophylaxis. The mortality benefits of minocycline might have simply been due to its bactericidal effects.

=== Hearing protection ===
Several preclinical studies (in vitro cell cultures and animal models) suggest that minocycline may have otoprotective benefits. Animal models indicate it could potentially reduce noise-induced and blast-induced hearing loss, possibly by protecting hair cells and mitigating inflammation. In vitro and animal studies also show minocycline may help decrease ototoxicity from certain drugs like gentamicin, neomycin, and cisplatin.

=== Other uses ===
Both minocycline and doxycycline have shown effectiveness in asthma due to immune-suppressing effects. Minocycline and doxycycline have modest effectiveness in treating rheumatoid arthritis. However, the 2015 American College of Rheumatology guideline for the treatment of rheumatoid arthritis does not include minocycline.

Minocycline also has been used as a "last-ditch" treatment for toxoplasmosis in AIDS patients.

Minocycline has been suggested as a possible treatment for post-COVID-19 syndrome ("long COVID"), but no quality clinical trials exist. The same is true of minocycline as a potential treatment of myalgic encephalomyelitis/chronic fatigue syndrome (ME/CFS).
