= Acne miliaris necrotica =

- Other names: Acne varioliformis
- Specialty: Dermatology
- Symptoms: Itchy fluid-filled bumps on typically scalp
- Complications: Scarring
- Causes: Inflammatory reaction to part of the hair follicle and S. aureus
- Diagnostic method: Visualisation, culture
- Treatment: Antibiotics
- Medication: Doxycycline

Acne miliaris necrotica is a severe form of folliculitis of typically the scalp. It presents as multiple fluid-filled bumps, sometimes occurring as solitary lesions that are usually very itchy. Shortly after appearing, the bumps burst and dry up. There may be scarring.

== Causes ==
The cause may be a result of an inflammatory reaction to part of the hair follicle and S. aureus.

== Diagnosis ==
Diagnosis is by visualisation and culture of the lesions.

== Treatment ==
There are multiple medications that are able to treat acne varioliformis.

=== Topical ===
- Clindamycin 1% lotion or Benzoyl peroxide/clindamycin gel
- Erythromycin 2% gel
- 1% hydrocortisone cream

=== Systemic ===
- Doxycycline 50 mg twice daily
- Isotretinoin 0.5 mg/kg daily

== History ==
The condition was first described by Sabouraud in 1928.

== See also ==
- List of cutaneous conditions
