= Tioxolone =

- Tioxolone Powder

Names
- Preferred IUPAC name 6-Hydroxy-2H-1,3-benzoxathiol-2-one

Identifiers
CAS Number	4991-65-5
3D model (JSmol)	Interactive image
Beilstein Reference	136261
ChEBI	CHEBI:568021
ChEMBL	ChEMBL442687
ChemSpider	65113
DrugBank	DB13343
ECHA InfoCard	100.023.321
EC Number	225-653-0
KEGG	D07211
PubChem CID	72139
RTECS number	DM2953750
UNII	S0FAJ1R9CD
CompTox Dashboard (EPA)	DTXSID5045885
- InChI: InChI=1S/C7H4O3S/c8-4-1-2-6-5(3-4)10-7(9)11-6/h1-3,8H Key: SLYPOVJCSQHITR-UHFFFAOYSA-N; InChI=1/C7H4O3S/c8-4-1-2-6-5(3-4)10-7(9)11-6/h1-3,8H Key: SLYPOVJCSQHITR-UHFFFAOYAC
- SMILES: C1=CC2=C(C=C1O)OC(=O)S2

Properties
Chemical formula	C_{7}H_{4}O_{3}S
Molar mass	168.16986
Melting point	158 to 160 °C (316 to 320 °F; 431 to 433 K)

Pharmacology
ATC code	D10AB03 (WHO)

Hazards
- GHS labelling
Pictograms	(GHS07: Exclamation mark)
Signal word	Warning
Hazard statements	H302, H315, H319, H335
Precautionary statements	P261, P264, P270, P271, P280, P301+P312, P302+P352, P304+P340, P305+P351+P338, P312, P321, P330, P332+P313, P337+P313, P362, P403+P233, P405, P501
- Except where otherwise noted, data are given for materials in their standard state (at 25 °C [77 °F], 100 kPa). verify (what is ?) Infobox references

Tioxolone (INN, also spelled thioxolone) is an anti-acne preparation.

== Synthesis ==
Tioxolone can be synthesized through the thiocyanation of resorcinol using a thiocyanate salt and copper(II) sulfate, followed by the cyclization of the resulting intermediate with hydrochloric acid.

Alternatively, it can be prepared via the acid-catalyzed condensation of p-benzoquinone with thiourea.
