= GT-20029 =

Clinical data
- Other names: GT20029; AR-PROTAC
- Routes of administration: Topical
- Drug class: Androgen receptor degradation enhancer

GT-20029, also known as AR-PROTAC, is an androgen receptor degradation enhancer which is under development for the treatment of androgenetic alopecia (male-pattern hair loss) and acne. It is used topically in gel form.

The drug acts as an androgen receptor (AR) proteolysis targeting chimera (PROTAC), facilitating the degradation of the AR via enhancement of ubiquitin-mediated proteolysis. It has been found to block the AR-mediated miniaturization of hair follicles in preclinical research.

GT-20029 is under development by Suzhou Kintor Pharmaceuticals. As of September 2024, it is in phase 2 clinical trials and is advancing to phase 3 trials. The chemical structure of GT-20029 does not yet appear to have been disclosed.

== See also ==
- List of investigational acne drugs
- List of investigational hair loss drugs
- Pyrilutamide (KX-826)
- Clascoterone (Winlevi; Breezula; CB-03-01)
