= Oleyl adapalenate =

Names
- IUPAC name (9Z)-Octadecen-1-yl 6-(4-methoxy-3-tricyclo[3.3.1.13,7]dec-1-ylphenyl)-2-naphthalenecarboxylate

Identifiers
CAS Number	2797026-98-1
3D model (JSmol)	Interactive image
PubChem CID	172866691
UNII	GRS4SNP9WC
- InChI: InChI=1S/C46H62O3/c1-3-4-5-6-7-8-9-10-11-12-13-14-15-16-17-18-25-49-45(47)42-22-21-38-29-39(19-20-40(38)30-42)41-23-24-44(48-2)43(31-41)46-32-35-26-36(33-46)28-37(27-35)34-46/h10-11,19-24,29-31,35-37H,3-9,12-18,25-28,32-34H2,1-2H3/b11-10- Key: PAMUYVOXXQOZMG-KHPPLWFESA-N
- SMILES: CCCCCCCCC=CCCCCCCCCOC(=O)c6ccc5cc(c4ccc(OC)c(C23CC1CC(CC(C1)C2)C3)c4)ccc5c6

Properties
Chemical formula	C_{46}H_{62}O_{3}
Molar mass	662.999 g·mol^{−1}
- Except where otherwise noted, data are given for materials in their standard state (at 25 °C [77 °F], 100 kPa). Infobox references

Oleyl adapalenate, sold under the brand name Adapinoid, is a lipophilic derivative of adapalene, and is a third-generation synthetic retinoid. It is primarily utilized in topical cosmetic formulations for the treatment of skin conditions associated with photoaging, rhytides (wrinkles), and acne induced post-inflammatory erythema, post-inflammatory hyperpigmentation, and scarring. Oleyl adapalenate differentiates itself from earlier retinoids by offering improved skin tolerability, reduced irritation, and enhanced stability.

== Structure ==
The structure of oleyl adapalenate is similar to that of adapalene, but with oleyl alcohol covalently bound via an ester bond to the free carboxylate group of adapalene. The lipophillic character of oleyl adapalenate allows it to be soluble in skincare oils and emollients, whereas adapalene, being neither lipophilic nor hydrophilic, has low solubility in solvents and is limited in how it can be compounded and delivered in topical drugs.

== Uses ==
Because oleyl adapalenate does not have the inherent oxidative instability of Vitamin A, it may be employed as a substitute for retinol and retinaldehyde in consumer skincare regimens for anti-aging, skin rejuvenation, and anti-acne.Furthermore, country regulatory authorities such as the European Union are limiting the use Vitamin A in cosmetics due to safety concerns, and these restrictions are not applicable to oleyl adapalenate
