= Motretinide =

Names
- IUPAC name N-Ethyl-3-methoxy-2-methyl-1,2,3,4-tetradehydro-17-norretinamide
- Systematic IUPAC name (2E,4E,6E,8E)-N-Ethyl-8-(4-methoxy-2,3,6-trimethylphenyl)-3,7-dimethylnona-2,4,6,8-tetraenamide

Identifiers
CAS Number	56281-36-8
3D model (JSmol)	Interactive image
ChemSpider	4880635
ECHA InfoCard	100.054.613
EC Number	260-094-6
KEGG	D05082
PubChem CID	6314185
UNII	W786807KL1
CompTox Dashboard (EPA)	DTXSID30878633
- InChI: InChI=1S/C23H31NO2/c1-8-24-23(25)14-17(3)11-9-10-16(2)12-13-21-18(4)15-22(26-7)20(6)19(21)5/h9-15H,8H2,1-7H3,(H,24,25)/b11-9+,13-12+,16-10+,17-14+ Key: IYIYMCASGKQOCZ-DJRRULDNSA-N; InChI=1/C23H31NO2/c1-8-24-23(25)14-17(3)11-9-10-16(2)12-13-21-18(4)15-22(26-7)20(6)19(21)5/h9-15H,8H2,1-7H3,(H,24,25)/b11-9+,13-12+,16-10+,17-14+ Key: IYIYMCASGKQOCZ-DJRRULDNBU
- SMILES: CCNC(=O)/C=C(\C)/C=C/C=C(\C)/C=C/C1=C(C(=C(C=C1C)OC)C)C

Properties
Chemical formula	C_{23}H_{31}NO_{2}
Molar mass	353.49774

Pharmacology
ATC code	D10AD05 (WHO)
- Except where otherwise noted, data are given for materials in their standard state (at 25 °C [77 °F], 100 kPa). verify (what is ?) Infobox references

Motretinide is an anti-acne preparation and aromatic analog of retinoic acid.
