= Adapalene =

Third-generation topical retinoid

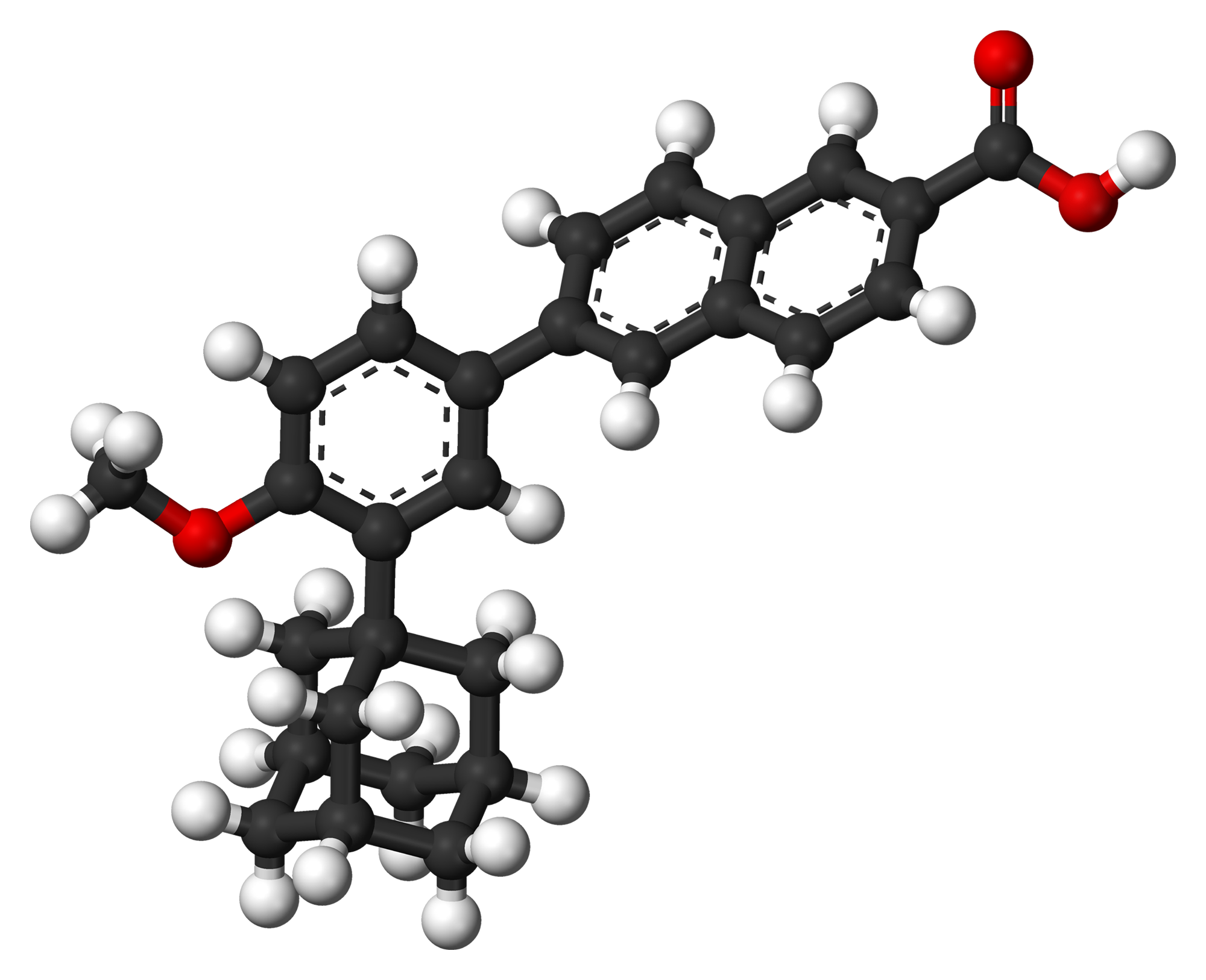

Clinical data
- Trade names: Differin, others
- AHFS/Drugs.com: Monograph
- MedlinePlus: a604001
- License data: US DailyMed: Adapalene
- Pregnancy category: AU: D
- Routes of administration: Topical
- Drug class: Retinoids
- ATC code: D10AD03 (WHO)

Physiological data
- Receptors: Retinoic acid receptor (RAR)
- Metabolism: Known to accumulate in the liver and GI-tract. In human, mouse, rat, rabbit, and dog cultured hepatocytes, metabolism appears to affect the methoxybenzene moiety but remains incompletely characterized. The major products of metabolism are glucuronides. Approximately 25% of the drug is metabolized; the rest is excreted as parent drug

Legal status
- Legal status: AU: S4 (Prescription only) / S3; BR: Class C2 (Retinoids); CA: ℞-only; UK: POM (Prescription only); US: OTC / Rx-only

Pharmacokinetic data
- Bioavailability: Very low
- Metabolism: Known to accumulate in the liver and GI-tract. In human, mouse, rat, rabbit, and dog cultured hepatocytes, metabolism appears to affect the methoxybenzene moiety but remains incompletely characterized. The major products of metabolism are glucuronides. Approximately 25% of the drug is metabolized; the rest is excreted as parent drug
- Metabolites: Glucuronides
- Elimination half-life: between 7 and 51 hours
- Excretion: Bile duct

Identifiers
- IUPAC name: 6-[3-(1-adamantyl)-4-methoxyphenyl]naphthalene-2-carboxylic acid
- CAS Number: 106685-40-9
- PubChem CID: 60164
- IUPHAR/BPS: 5429
- DrugBank: DB00210
- ChemSpider: 54244
- UNII: 1L4806J2QF
- KEGG: D01112
- ChEBI: CHEBI:31174
- ChEMBL: ChEMBL1265
- CompTox Dashboard (EPA): DTXSID5046481
- ECHA InfoCard: 100.149.379

Chemical and physical data
- Formula: C_{28}H_{28}O_{3}
- Molar mass: 412.529 g·mol^{−1}
- 3D model (JSmol): Interactive image
- Melting point: 300 °C (572 °F)
- Boiling point: 606.3 °C (1,123.3 °F)
- SMILES: COC1=C(C=C(C=C1)C2=CC3=C(C=C2)C=C(C=C3)C(=O)O)C45CC6CC(C4)CC(C6)C5
- InChI: InChI=1S/C28H28O3/c1-31-26-7-6-23(21-2-3-22-12-24(27(29)30)5-4-20(22)11-21)13-25(26)28-14-17-8-18(15-28)10-19(9-17)16-28/h2-7,11-13,17-19H,8-10,14-16H2,1H3,(H,29,30); Key:LZCDAPDĜCYOEH-UHFFFAOYSA-N

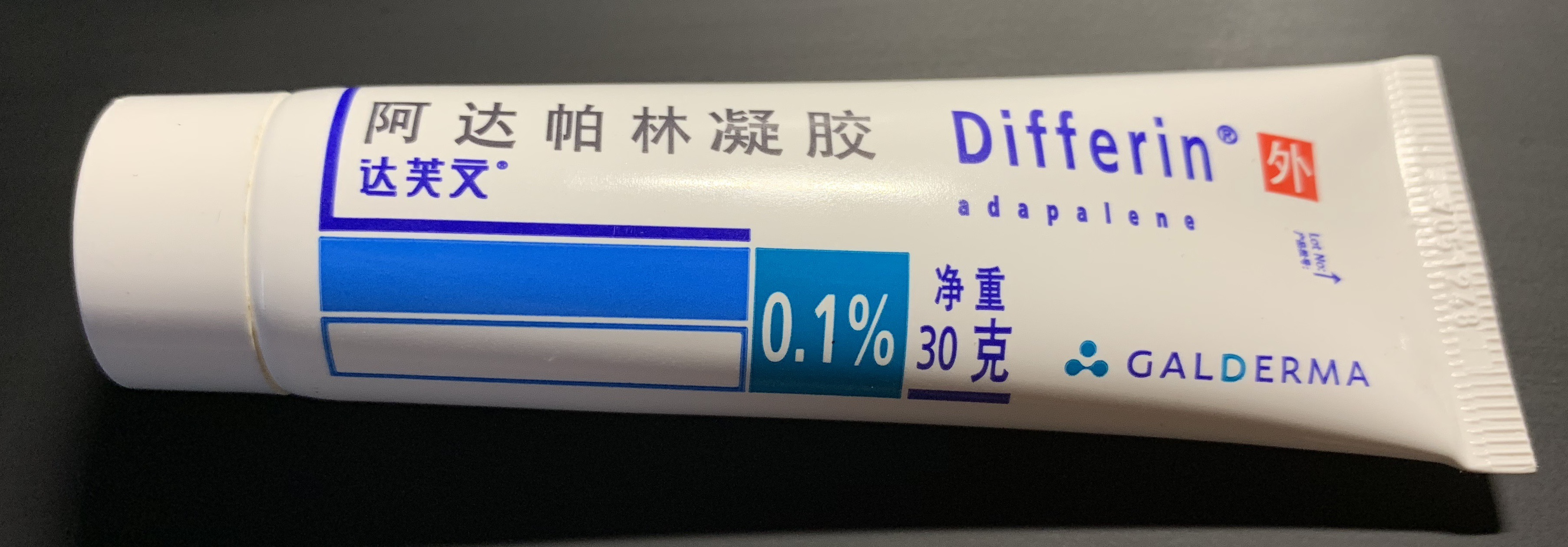
Adapalene Gel, sold as trade name Differin in China

Adapalene, sold under the brand name Differin among others, is a third-generation topical retinoid primarily used in the treatment of mild-moderate acne, and is also used off-label to treat keratosis pilaris as well as other skin conditions. Studies have found adapalene is as effective as other retinoids, while causing less irritation. It also has several advantages over other retinoids. The adapalene molecule is more stable compared to tretinoin and tazarotene, which leads to less concern for photodegradation. It is also chemically more stable compared to the other two retinoids, allowing it to be used in combination with benzoyl peroxide. Due to its effects on keratinocyte proliferation and differentiation, adapalene is superior to tretinoin for the treatment of comedonal acne and is often used as a first-line agent. The Swiss company Galderma developed adapalene.

== Medical uses ==
Per the recommendations of the Global Alliance on Improving Outcomes of Acne, retinoids such as adapalene are considered first-line therapy in acne treatment and are to be used either independently or in conjunction with benzoyl peroxide and/or an antimicrobial agent, like clindamycin, for maximum efficacy. An adapalene/benzoyl peroxide combination medication is also available. Furthermore, adapalene, like other retinoids, increases the efficacy and penetration of other topical acne medications that are used in conjunction with topical retinoids as well as hastens the improvement of the postinflammatory hyperpigmentation caused by acne. In the long term, it can be used as maintenance therapy.

=== Off-label uses ===
Adapalene has the unique ability to inhibit keratinocyte differentiation and decrease keratin deposition. This property makes adapalene an effective treatment for keratosis pilaris and callus. Other non-FDA approved indications that have been reported in the literature include treatment of warts, molluscum contagiosum, Darier's disease, photoaging, pigmentary disorders, actinic keratoses and alopecia areata.

=== Cosmetic uses ===
While adapalene is sold at 0.1% in over-the-counter topical products for treatment of acne, its availability is otherwise restricted to prescription drugs. A version of adapalene, oleyl adapalenate, is available for broader skincare and cosmetic usage.

== Side effects ==
Of the three topical retinoids, adapalene is often regarded as the best tolerated. It can cause mild adverse effects such as photosensitivity, irritation, redness, dryness, itching, and burning, and 1% to 10% of users experience a brief sensation of warmth or stinging, as well as dry skin, peeling and redness during the first two to four weeks using the medication. These effects are considered mild and usually decrease over time. Serious allergic reactions are rare.

=== Pregnancy & lactation ===
Use of topical adapalene in pregnancy has not been well studied but has a theoretical risk of retinoid embryopathy. Thus far, there is no evidence that the cream causes problems in the baby if used during pregnancy.

Topical adapalene has poor systemic absorption and results in low blood levels (less than 0.025 mcg/L) even after long term use, suggesting that there is low risk of harm for a nursing infant.

== Interactions ==
Adapalene has been shown to enhance the efficacy of topical clindamycin, although adverse effects are also increased. Application of adapalene gel to the skin 3–5 minutes before application of clindamycin enhances penetration of clindamycin into the skin, which may enhance the overall efficacy of the treatment as compared to clindamycin alone.

== Pharmacology ==
Unlike the retinoid tretinoin (Retin-A), adapalene has also been shown to retain its efficacy when applied at the same time as benzoyl peroxide due to its more stable chemical structure. Furthermore, photodegradation of the molecule is less of a concern in comparison to tretinoin and tazarotene.

=== Pharmacokinetics ===
Absorption of adapalene through the skin is low. A study with six acne patients treated once daily for five days with two grams of adapalene cream applied to 1,000 cm^{2} (160 sq in) of skin found no quantifiable amounts, or less than 0.35 ng/mL of the drug, in the patients' blood plasma. Controlled trials of chronic users of adapalene have found drug levels in the patients' plasma to be 0.25 ng/mL.

=== Pharmacodynamics ===
Adapalene is highly lipophilic. When applied topically, it readily penetrates hair follicles and absorption occurs five minutes after topical application. After penetration into the follicle, adapalene binds to nuclear retinoic acid receptors (namely retinoic acid receptor beta and gamma). These complexes then bind to the retinoid X receptor which induces gene transcription by binding to specific DNA sites, thus modulating downstream keratinocyte proliferation and differentiation. This results in normalization of keratinocyte differentiation, allowing for decreased microcomedone formation, decreased clogging of pores, and increased exfoliation by increasing cell turnover. Adapalene is also regarded as an anti-inflammatory agent, as it suppresses the inflammatory response stimulated by the presence of Cutibacterium acnes, and inhibits both lipoxygenase activity and the metabolism of arachidonic acid into prostaglandins.

Adapalene selectively targets retinoic acid receptor beta and retinoic acid receptor gamma when applied to epithelial cells such as those found in the skin. Its agonism of the gamma subtype is largely responsible for adapalene's observed effects. In fact, when adapalene is applied in conjunction with a retinoic acid receptor gamma antagonist, adapalene loses clinical efficacy.

Retinization is a common temporary phenomenon reported by patients when initiating use of retinoids. Within the initial period of treatment, skin can become red, irritated, dry and may burn or itch from retinoid application; however, this tends to resolve within four weeks with once a day use.

=== Metabolism ===
Extensive information regarding adapalene metabolism in humans is unavailable, although it is known to accumulate in the liver and GI-tract. In human, mouse, rat, rabbit, and dog cultured hepatocytes, metabolism appears to affect the methoxybenzene moiety but remains incompletely characterized. The major products of metabolism are glucuronides. Approximately 25% of the drug is metabolized; the rest is excreted as the parent drug.

== History ==
Adapalene was a research product of the Swiss company Galderma and was patented in Luxembourg in 1986 and in the US in 1988. Adapalene was approved as a prescription medication in 1996 by the US Food and Drug Administration (FDA) for use in the treatment of acne. In 2016, the US FDA approved adapalene gel 0.1% for over-the-counter (OTC) sale, marking the first time a formerly prescription-only retinoid became available without a prescription for acne treatment.

== Research ==
A study has concluded that adapalene can be used to treat plantar warts and may help clear lesions faster than cryotherapy. A computational study claims that adapalene can be used as a potential entry inhibitor for Omicron variant of SARS-CoV-2.
