= Pyrilutamide =

Chemical compound

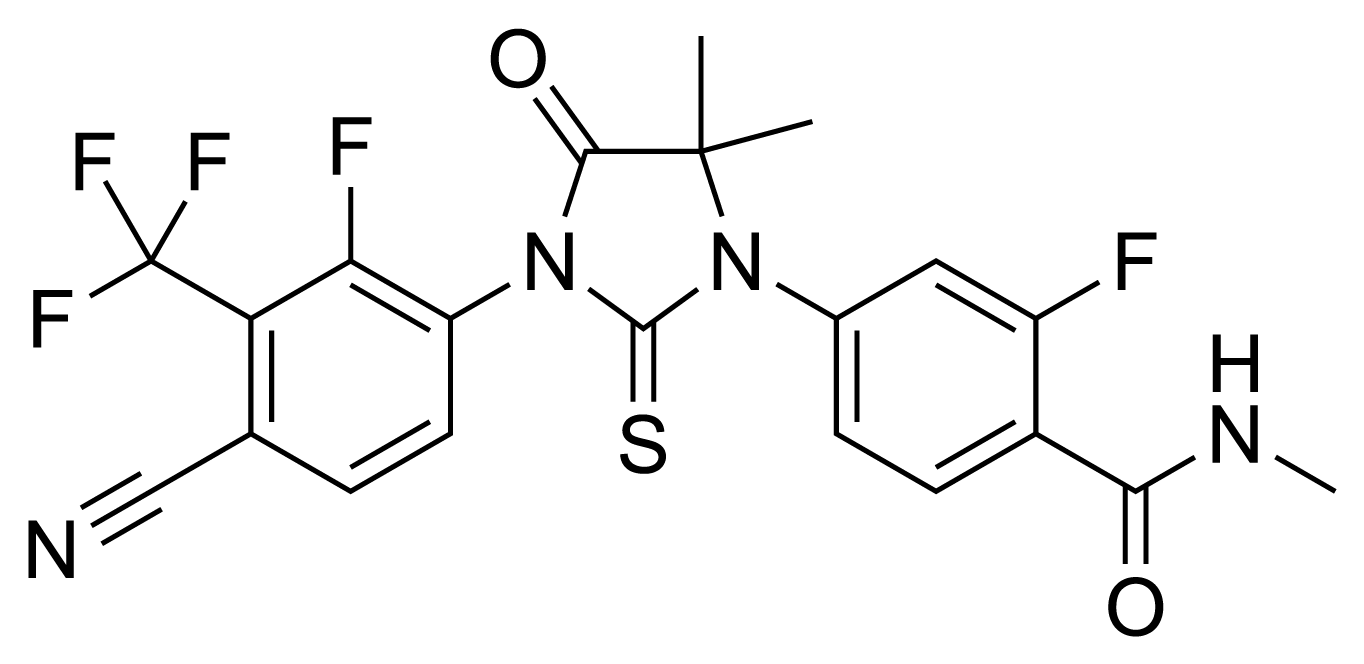

Clinical data
- Other names: KX-826; KX826
- Routes of administration: Topical
- Drug class: Nonsteroidal antiandrogen; Androgen receptor antagonist
- ATC code: None

Identifiers
- IUPAC name: 4-(3-(4-cyano-2-fluoro-3-(trifluoromethyl)phenyl)-5,5-dimethyl-4-oxo-2-thioxoimidazolidin-1-yl)-2-fluoro-N-methylbenzamide
- CAS Number: 1272719-00-2
- PubChem CID: 50940514
- ChemSpider: 115037042

Chemical and physical data
- Formula: C_{21}H_{15}F_{5}N_{4}O_{2}S
- Molar mass: 482.43 g·mol^{−1}
- 3D model (JSmol): Interactive image
- SMILES: CNC(=O)C1=C(F)C=C(C=C1)N1C(=S)N(C(=O)C1(C)C)C1=C(F)C(=C(C=C1)C#N)C(F)(F)F
- InChI: InChI=1S/C21H15F5N4O2S/c1-20(2)18(32)29(14-7-4-10(9-27)15(16(14)23)21(24,25)26)19(33)30(20)11-5-6-12(13(22)8-11)17(31)28-3/h4-8H,1-3H3,(H,28,31); Key:CGRMNGGGSWLDDC-UHFFFAOYSA-N

Pyrilutamide (developmental code name KX-826) is a nonsteroidal antiandrogen (NSAA) which is under development for the treatment of androgenic alopecia (pattern hair loss) and acne. The drug is being developed by Suzhou Kintor Pharmaceuticals. As of February 2025, it is in phase 3 clinical trials for androgenic alopecia and phase 2 trials for acne. The drug was also under development for the treatment of diabetic foot ulcers, but development for this indication was discontinued.

== Pharmacology ==
=== Pharmacodynamics ===
Pyrilutamide is a selective and high-affinity silent antagonist of the androgen receptor (AR). It has an affinity (IC_{50}) of 0.28 nM, relative to 3.1 nM in the case of bicalutamide.

== See also ==
- List of investigational acne drugs
- List of investigational hair loss drugs
- GT-20029 (AR-PROTAC)
- Clascoterone (Winlevi; Breezula; CB-03-01)
