= Adapalene/benzoyl peroxide =

Pharmaceutical combination

Combination of
- Adapalene: Retinoid
- Benzoyl peroxide: Oxidizing agent

Clinical data
- Trade names: Epiduo Gel, Epiduo Forte, others
- AHFS/Drugs.com: Micromedex Detailed Consumer Information
- License data: US DailyMed: Adapalene and benzoyl peroxide
- Routes of administration: Topical
- ATC code: D10AD53 (WHO) D10AE51 (WHO)

Legal status
- Legal status: AU: S4 (Prescription only); US: OTC / Rx-only; In general: ℞ (Prescription only)

Identifiers
- CAS Number: 1194805-81-6
- KEGG: D10792

Adapalene/benzoyl peroxide, sold under the brand name Epiduo among others, is a fixed-dose combination medication for the treatment of acne vulgaris. It is a combination of adapalene, a synthetic retinoid; and benzoyl peroxide, an oxidizing agent.

Adapalene/benzoyl peroxide (Epiduo Gel) was approved for medical use in the United States in December 2008. Adapalene/benzoyl peroxide (Epiduo Forte) with a stronger adapalene strength was approved for medical use in the United States in July 2015. Adapalene/benzoyl peroxide (Differin Epiduo Acne Gel) is an over-the-counter version of Epiduo Gel that was approved for medical use in the United States in May 2026.

It is available as a generic medication. In 2023, it was the 319th most commonly prescribed medication in the United States, with more than 200,000 prescriptions.

== Medical uses ==
Adapalene/benzoyl peroxide is indicated for the topical treatment of acne vulgaris.

== Side effects ==
Commonly reported side effects include the following:

- Skin redness
- Scaling
- Dry skin
- Contact dermatitis
- Skin irritation
- Stinging
- Burning
