= Tretinoin/benzoyl peroxide =

Medication for acne

Combination of
- Tretinoin: Retinoid
- Benzoyl peroxide: Oxidizing agent

Clinical data
- Trade names: Twyneo
- Other names: S6G5T-3
- License data: US DailyMed: Tretinoin_and_benzoyl_peroxide
- Routes of administration: Topical
- ATC code: D10AD51 (WHO)

Legal status
- Legal status: US: ℞-only

Identifiers
- KEGG: D12338

Tretinoin/benzoyl peroxide, sold under the brand name Twyneo, is a fixed-dose combination medication used for the treatment of acne. It contains tretinoin, a vitamin A derivative, and benzoyl peroxide, an oxidizing agent.

The U.S. Food and Drug Administration (FDA) approved this medication for use in July 2021. Historically, the co-formulation of these two active ingredients was avoided because benzoyl peroxide typically causes the oxidative degradation of tretinoin when stored together. To address this stability issue, Twyneo employs a silica-based sol-gel microencapsulation technology, which serves as a physical barrier that prevents the benzoyl peroxide from damaging the tretinoin within the vehicle.
