= Gevokizumab =

Monoclonal antibody

Monoclonal antibody
- Type: Whole antibody
- Source: Humanized (from mouse)
- Target: Interleukin 1β

Clinical data
- ATC code: None

Identifiers
- CAS Number: 1129435-60-4
- ChemSpider: None
- UNII: QX3JU54GYQ
- KEGG: D09911

Chemical and physical data
- Formula: C_{6442}H_{9962}N_{1710}O_{2010}S_{52}
- Molar mass: 145193.64 g·mol^{−1}

Gevokizumab is an experimental monoclonal antibody, developed by XOMA Corporation, with allosteric modulating properties. Gevokizumab binds to interleukin-1 beta (IL-1 beta), a pro-inflammatory cytokine, and downmodulates the cellular signaling events that produce inflammation. IL-1 beta has been implicated in cardiovascular conditions, lung cancer, and auto-inflammatory diseases.

On August 25, 2017, XOMA Corporation licensed the global commercial rights to gevokizumab to Novartis. Under the license agreement, Novartis will have worldwide rights to gevokizumab, and will be solely responsible for the development and commercialization of antibodies and products containing antibodies arising from gevokizumab. XOMA received an approximately $16 million upfront payment, and Novartis repaid in its entirety the approximately €12 million of debt owed by XOMA to Les Laboratoires Servier. XOMA is eligible to receive up to $438 million in development, regulatory and commercial milestones plus tiered high-single to mid-double-digit royalties on net sales of gevokizumab.
