= Denifanstat =

Chemical compound

Clinical data
- Other names: TVB-2640

Legal status
- Legal status: Investigational

Identifiers
- IUPAC name: 4-[1-[4-Cyclobutyl-2-methyl-5-(5-methyl-1H-1,2,4-triazol-3-yl)benzoyl]piperidin-4-yl]benzonitrile
- CAS Number: 1399177-37-7
- PubChem CID: 66548316
- ChemSpider: 58955989
- UNII: 4GF95B2LZA
- ChEMBL: ChEMBL3661754

Chemical and physical data
- Formula: C_{27}H_{29}N_{5}O
- Molar mass: 439.563 g·mol^{−1}
- 3D model (JSmol): Interactive image
- SMILES: CC1=CC(=C(C=C1C(=O)N2CCC(CC2)C3=CC=C(C=C3)C#N)C4=NNC(=N4)C)C5CCC5
- InChI: InChI=1S/C27H29N5O/c1-17-14-24(22-4-3-5-22)25(26-29-18(2)30-31-26)15-23(17)27(33)32-12-10-21(11-13-32)20-8-6-19(16-28)7-9-20/h6-9,14-15,21-22H,3-5,10-13H2,1-2H3,(H,29,30,31); Key:BBGOSBDSLYHMRA-UHFFFAOYSA-N

Denifanstat (TVB-2640) is a small-molecule drug and fatty acid synthase inhibitor. Developed by Sagimet Biosciences, it has been tested in various types of cancer and for non-alcoholic steatohepatitis.
