= ATC code D10 =

ATC code D10 Anti-acne preparations is a therapeutic subgroup of the Anatomical Therapeutic Chemical Classification System, a system of alphanumeric codes developed by the World Health Organization (WHO) for the classification of drugs and other medical products. Subgroup D10 is part of the anatomical group D Dermatologicals.

Codes for veterinary use (ATCvet codes) can be created by placing the letter Q in front of the human ATC code: for example, QD10.
National versions of the ATC classification may include additional codes not present in this list, which follows the WHO version.

== D10A Anti-acne preparations for topical use ==
=== D10AA Corticosteroids, combinations for treatment of acne ===
D10AA01 Fluorometholone
D10AA02 Methylprednisolone
D10AA03 Dexamethasone

=== D10AB Preparations containing sulfur ===
D10AB01 Bithionol
D10AB02 Sulfur
D10AB03 Tioxolone
D10AB05 Mesulfen

=== D10AD Retinoids for topical use in acne ===
D10AD01 Tretinoin
D10AD02 Retinol
D10AD03 Adapalene
D10AD04 Isotretinoin
D10AD05 Motretinide
D10AD06 Trifarotene
D10AD51 Tretinoin, combinations
D10AD53 Adapalene, combinations
D10AD54 Isotretinoin, combinations

=== D10AE Peroxides ===
D10AE01 Benzoyl peroxide
D10AE51 Benzoyl peroxide, combinations

=== D10AF Anti-infectives for treatment of acne ===
D10AF01 Clindamycin
D10AF02 Erythromycin
D10AF03 Chloramphenicol
D10AF04 Meclocycline
D10AF05 Nadifloxacin
D10AF06 Sulfacetamide
D10AF07 Minocycline
D10AF51 Clindamycin, combinations
D10AF52 Erythromycin, combinations

=== D10AX Other anti-acne preparations for topical use ===
D10AX01 Aluminium chloride
D10AX02 Resorcinol
D10AX03 Azelaic acid
D10AX04 Aluminium oxide
D10AX05 Dapsone
D10AX06 Clascoterone
D10AX30 Various combinations

== D10B Anti-acne preparations for systemic use ==
=== D10BA Retinoids for treatment of acne ===
D10BA01 Isotretinoin

=== D10BX Other anti-acne preparations for systemic use ===
D10BX01 Ichtasol
