= Tretinoin =

Medication

Clinical data
- Pronunciation: See pronunciation note
- Trade names: Retin-A, Avita, Renova, others
- Other names: ATRA
- AHFS/Drugs.com: Monograph; Topical Monograph
- MedlinePlus: a608032
- License data: US DailyMed: Tretinoin
- Pregnancy category: AU: X (High risk)/ (Oral); D (Topical)
- Routes of administration: Topical, by mouth
- ATC code: D10AD01 (WHO) L01XF01 (WHO), D10AD51 (WHO)

Legal status
- Legal status: AU: S4 (Prescription only); BR: Class C2 (Retinoids); UK: POM (Prescription only); US: ℞-only; EU: Rx-only

Pharmacokinetic data
- Protein binding: > 95%
- Elimination half-life: 0.5–2 hours

Identifiers
- IUPAC name: (2E,4E,6E,8E)-3,7-Dimethyl-9-(2,6,6-trimethylcyclohexen-1-yl)nona-2,4,6,8-tetraenoic acid
- CAS Number: 302-79-4
- PubChem CID: 444795
- IUPHAR/BPS: 2644
- DrugBank: DB00755
- ChemSpider: 392618
- UNII: 5688UTC01R
- KEGG: D00094; C00777
- ChEBI: CHEBI:15367
- ChEMBL: ChEMBL38
- CompTox Dashboard (EPA): DTXSID7021239
- ECHA InfoCard: 100.005.573

Chemical and physical data
- Formula: C_{20}H_{28}O_{2}
- Molar mass: 300.442 g·mol^{−1}
- 3D model (JSmol): Interactive image
- Melting point: 180 °C (356 °F)
- SMILES: CC1=C(C(CCC1)(C)C)C=CC(=CC=CC(=CC(=O)O)C)C
- InChI: InChI=1S/C20H28O2/c1-15(8-6-9-16(2)14-19(21)22)11-12-18-17(3)10-7-13-20(18,4)5/h6,8-9,11-12,14H,7,10,13H2,1-5H3,(H,21,22)/b9-6+,12-11+,15-8+,16-14+; Key:SHGAZHPCJJPHSC-YCNIQYBTSA-N dd><htt//60967409 Arsen Ramirez Cruzﺁ

Tretinoin, also known as all-trans retinoic acid (ATRA), is a medication used for the treatment of acne and acute promyelocytic leukemia. For acne, it is applied to the skin as a cream, gel or ointment. For acute promyelocytic leukemia, it is effective only when the RARA-PML fusion mutation is present and is taken by mouth for up to three months. Topical tretinoin is also the most extensively investigated retinoid therapy for photoaging.

Common side effects when used as a cream are limited to the skin and include skin redness, peeling, and sun sensitivity. When taken by mouth, side effects include hypertriglyceridemia, hypercholesterolemia, shortness of breath, headache, numbness, depression, skin dryness, itchiness, hair loss, vomiting, muscle pains, and vision changes. Other severe side effects include high white blood cell counts and blood clots. Use during pregnancy is contraindicated due to the risk of birth defects. It is in the retinoid family of medications.

Tretinoin was patented in 1957 and approved for medical use in 1962. It is on the World Health Organization's List of Essential Medicines. Tretinoin is available as a generic medication. In 2023, it was the 197th most commonly prescribed medication in the United States, with more than two million prescriptions.

== Medical uses ==
=== Skin use ===
==== Acne ====
Tretinoin is most commonly used to treat acne both non-inflammatory, such as comedonal acne, and inflammatory, such as acne vulgaris. It's effective across a diverse patient population, including those of darker skin tones, and has been shown to significantly lighten postinflammatory hyperpigmented lesions in black patients. Multiple studies support the efficacy of topical retinoids in the treatment of acne vulgaris. It is sometimes used in conjunction with other topical acne medications to enhance their penetration. In addition to treating active acne, retinoids accelerate the resolution of acne-induced postinflammatory hyperpigmentation. It is also useful as maintenance therapy for people who have responded well to their initial treatment, reducing the prolonged use of antibiotics for acne.Lotion-based tretinoin formulations have been developed to improve tolerability while maintaining efficacy in acne treatment.

==== Photoaging ====
Photoaging is premature skin aging resulting from prolonged and repeated exposure to solar radiation. Features of photoaging include fine and coarse wrinkles, changes in skin pigmentation, and loss of elasticity. In human skin, topical retinoids increase collagen production, induce epidermal hyperplasia, and decrease keratinocyte and melanocyte atypia. Topical tretinoin is the most extensively investigated retinoid therapy for photoaging. Topical tretinoin can be used for mild to severe photoaging in people of all skin types. Several weeks or months of use are typically required before improvement is appreciated. Although it has only been studied for up to two years, it may be continued indefinitely. A long-term maintenance regimen with a lower concentration or less frequent application may be an alternative to continued use.

==== Available forms ====
Topical tretinoin is available in several formulations, including creams, gels, microsphere gels, and lotions.

Lotion-based formulations of Tretinoin, such as 0.05% tretinoin lotion, were developed from polymeric emulsion technology to improve the skin's tolerability while maintaining clinical efficacy. Clinical trials demonstrated these lotions significantly reduce both inflammatory and non-inflammatory acne lesions. These formulations were generally well tolerated with the most common side effect being skin dryness. The formulations were significant in reducing acne lesions among diverse patient demographics and sexes, including Hispanic and black patients.

The chemical stability of tretinoin is significantly affected by light and oxidizing agents. When combined with 10% benzoyl peroxide and exposed to light, significant degradation occurs, with over 50% of the compound degrading within approximately two hours and up to 95% within 24 hours.

To address this instability, alternative formulations have been developed. The microsphere gel formulation utilizes microsponge technology, encapsulating tretinoin within an aqueous gel matrix to enhance stability and control the release of the active ingredient. When microsponge tretinoin is exposed to benzoyl peroxide and light, it exhibits improved stability compared to other formulations, with only approximately 1% degradation after four hours and approximately 13% after 24 hours. In addition to the use of microsponges for stabilization, certain microencapsulation formulations of tretinoin/benzoyl peroxide utilize a silica-based sol-gel technology to combine these ingredients without damaging the tretinoin. These amorphous silica shells physically separate the active agents to prevent degradation, while both systems work to regulate delivery into the skin to enhance shelf life and patient tolerability.

=== Leukemia ===
Tretinoin is used to induce remission in people with acute promyelocytic leukemia (APL) who have a mutation (the t(15;17) translocation that gives rise to the PML::RARα fusion gene). It is not used for maintenance therapy.

Tretinoin is not effective for the treatment of non-APL forms of acute myeloid leukemia or other forms of leukemia. Preclinical studies and clinical data analysis suggest that retinoic acid promotes the growth of T-cell acute lymphoblastic leukemia.

== Side effects ==
=== Topical ===
Topical tretinoin is for use only on the skin and should not be applied to eyes or mucosal tissues. Common side effects include skin irritation, redness, swelling, and blistering. If irritation is a problem, a decrease in the frequency of application to every other or every third night can be considered, and the frequency of application can be increased as tolerance improves. The fine skin flaking that is often seen can be gently exfoliated with a washcloth. A non-comedogenic facial moisturizer can also be applied if needed. Delaying the application of the retinoid for at least 20 minutes after washing and drying the face may also be helpful. Topical retinoids are not true photosensitizing drugs, but people using topical retinoids have described symptoms of increased sun sensitivity. This is thought to be due to the thinning of the stratum corneum leading to a decreased barrier against ultraviolet light exposure, as well as an enhanced sensitivity due to the presence of cutaneous irritation.

=== Oral ===
The oral form of the drug has boxed warnings concerning the risks of retinoic acid syndrome and leukocytosis. Other significant side effects include a risk of thrombosis, benign intracranial hypertension in children, high lipids (hypercholesterolemia and/or hypertriglyceridemia), and liver damage.

There are many significant side effects from this drug that include malaise (66%), shivering (63%), hemorrhage (60%), infections (58%), peripheral edema (52%), pain (37%), chest discomfort (32%), edema (29%), disseminated intravascular coagulation (26%), weight increase (23%), injection site reactions (17%), anorexia (17%), weight decrease (17%), and myalgia (14%).

Respiratory side effects usually signify retinoic acid syndrome (also called differentiation syndrome), and include upper respiratory tract disorders (63%), dyspnea (60%), respiratory insufficiency (26%), pleural effusion (20%), pneumonia (14%), rales (14%), and expiratory wheezing (14%), and many others at less than 10%. Around 23% of people taking the drug have reported earache or a feeling of fullness in their ears. Gastrointestinal disorders include bleeding (34%), abdominal pain (31%), diarrhea (23%), constipation (17%), dyspepsia (14%), and swollen belly (11%) and many others at less than 10%.

Cardiovascular side effects include arrhythmias (23%), flushing (23%), hypotension (14%), hypertension (11%), phlebitis (11%), and cardiac failure (6%) and for 3% of patients: cardiac arrest, myocardial infarction, enlarged heart, heart murmur, ischemia, stroke, myocarditis, pericarditis, pulmonary hypertension, secondary cardiomyopathy.

In the nervous system, side effects include dizziness (20%), paresthesias (17%), anxiety (17%), insomnia (14%), depression (14%), confusion (11%), and many others at less than 10% frequency.

In the urinary system, side effects include chronic kidney disease (11%) and several others at less than 10% frequency.

== Mechanism of action ==
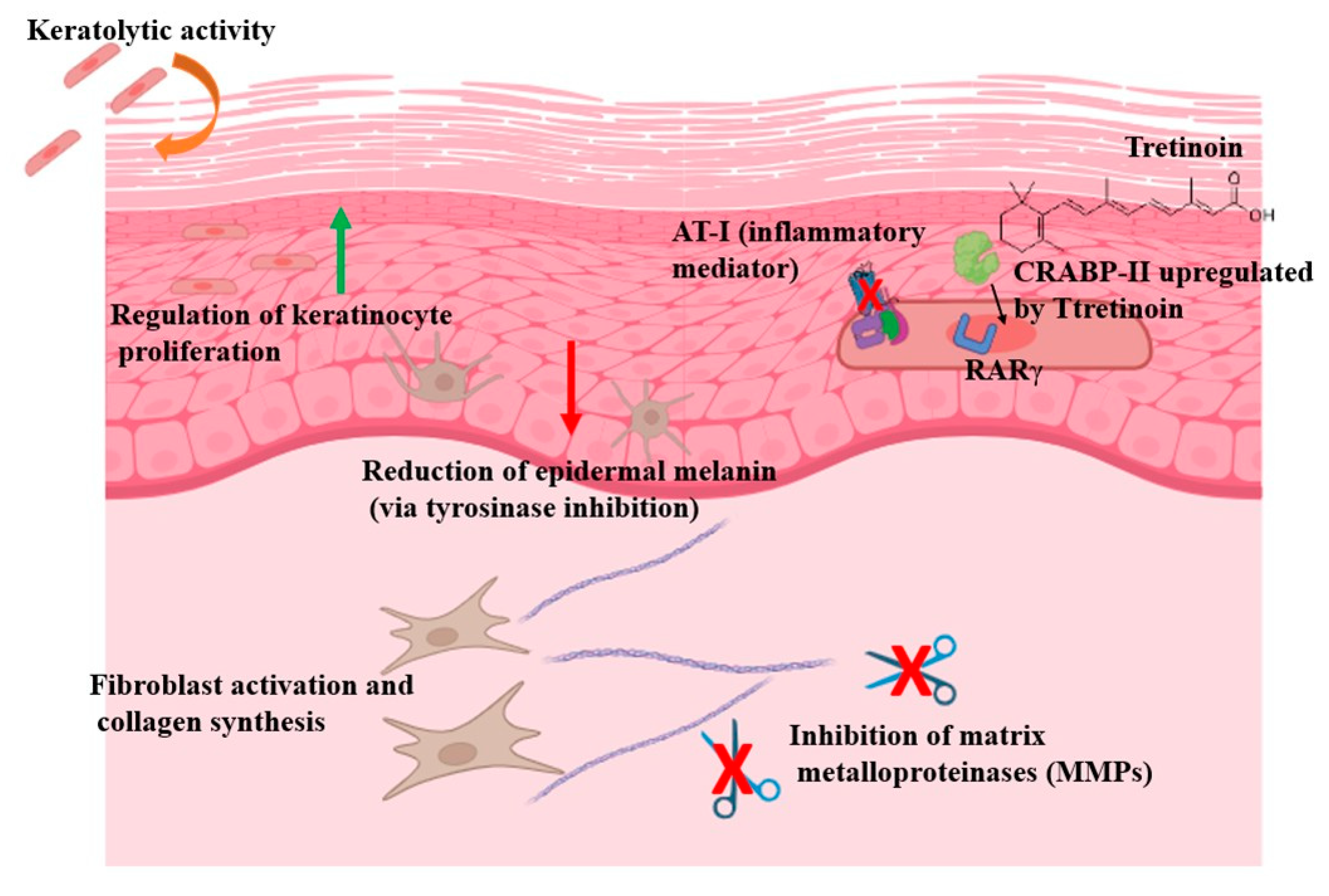
Effects of topical tretinoin on skin

For its use in acute promyelocytic leukemia, tretinoin causes the RARA:PML fusion oncogene to degrade, resulting in the loss of the key driver oncogene. This degradation allows the blasts to mature and results in dramatic responses. This response is typically short-lived as CYP26 genes are rapidly upregulated to degrade tretinoin. The RARA:PML oncogene is not present in other cancer types, thus explaining why tretinoin and other retinoids have not been effective across hundreds of different trials.

For its use in acne, tretinoin (along with other retinoids) are vitamin A derivatives that act by binding to two nuclear receptor families within keratinocytes: the retinoic acid receptors (RAR) and the retinoid X receptors (RXR). These events contribute to the normalization of follicular keratinization and decreased cohesiveness of keratinocytes, resulting in reduced follicular occlusion and microcomedone formation. The retinoid-receptor complex competes for coactivator proteins of AP-1, a key transcription factor involved in inflammation. Retinoids also down-regulate expression of toll-like receptor (TLR)-2, which has been implicated in the inflammatory response in acne. Moreover, tretinoin and retinoids may enhance the penetration of other topical acne medications.

The biological mechanism behind triglyceride and cholesterol elevations remains under investigation.

== Synthesis ==
Biosynthetic pathway of tretinon

All-trans retinoic acid is produced by the body from dietary factors including retinol, retinyl esters or beta-carotene. The beta-carotene is first cleaved by beta-carotene 15-15'-monooxygenase to retinol which is subsequently oxidized by RDH and ALDH enzymes to produce all-trans retinoic acid (see retinoic acid). Tretinoin is produced synthetically using standard industrial practices.

== History ==
Tretinoin was initially patented in 1957 and received approval for clinical use in 1962. Its application as an acne treatment was co-developed by James Fulton and Albert Kligman at the University of Pennsylvania in the 1960s. Phase I trials, the first conducted on human subjects, were performed on inmates at Holmesburg Prison during a long-running regime of non-therapeutic testing on prison inmates at Holmesburg. The University of Pennsylvania held the patent for Retin-A, which it subsequently licensed to various pharmaceutical companies, and the compound received US Food and Drug Administration (FDA) approval for acne in 1971.

Treatment of acute promyelocytic leukemia was first introduced at Ruijin Hospital in Shanghai by Wang Zhenyi in a 1988 clinical trial.

In 1997, the FDA approved tretinoin microsphere gel, marketed as Retin-A Micro, for the treatment of acne.

== Etymology ==
The origin of the name tretinoin is uncertain, although several sources agree (one with probability, one with asserted certainty) that it probably comes from trans- + retinoic [acid] + -in, which is plausible given that tretinoin is the all-trans isomer of retinoic acid. The name isotretinoin is the same root tretinoin plus the prefix iso-. Regarding pronunciation, the following variants apply equally to both tretinoin and isotretinoin. Given that retinoic is pronounced /ˌrɛtɪˈnoʊɪk/, it is natural that /ˌtrɛtɪˈnoʊɪn/ is a commonly heard pronunciation. Dictionary transcriptions also include /ˌtrɪˈtɪnoʊɪn/ (tri-TIN-oh-in) and /ˈtrɛtɪnɔɪn/.

== Research ==
Tretinoin has been explored as a treatment for hair loss, potentially as a way to increase the ability of minoxidil (by acting as an enzyme and accelerating the production of minoxidil sulfate) to penetrate the scalp, but the evidence is weak and contradictory.
