= Lip licker's dermatitis =

- Other names: Irritant contact cheilitis, perioral irritant contact dermatitis, perioral dermatitis
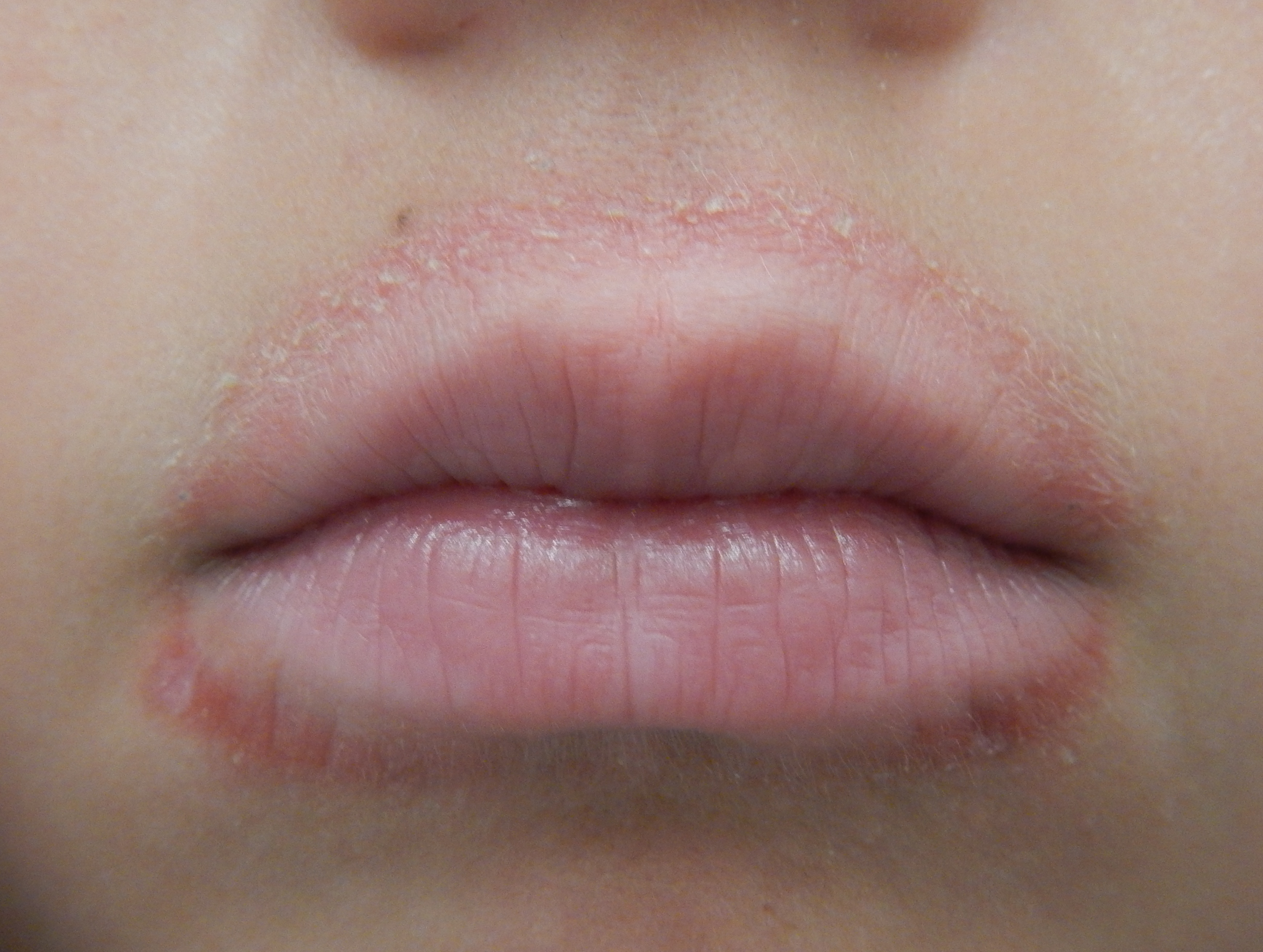
- Lip licker's dermatitis from a child repeatedly licking their lips
- Causes: Repeated lip licking
- Diagnostic method: Based on symptoms
- Differential diagnosis: Perioral dermatitis, allergic contact dermatitis
- Medication: Emollient, Lip Balm, Topical steroid,

Lip licker's dermatitis is a type of skin inflammation around the lips due to damage by saliva from repetitive lip licking and is classified as a subtype of irritant contact cheilitis. The resulting scaling, redness, chapping, and crusting makes a well-defined ring around the lips. The rash may extend as far as the tongue can reach and usually does not occur at the corners of the mouth. It commonly occurs during winter months but some people can have it year-round if lip licking is a chronic habit.

Lip licker's dermatitis differs from perioral dermatitis, which spares the vermilion border. Allergic contact dermatitis presents similar signs and symptoms that can be differentiated from lip licker's dermatitis with an allergy patch skin test.

It is treated with simple moisturizers, emollients, and sometimes topical steroids, while perioral dermatitis is worsened by topical steroids. It is important to identify the cause of the inflammation, whether it is due to lip licking or a more complex cause, in order to successfully treat and alleviate symptoms. Children are affected more often than adults and sometimes special approaches need to be considered especially if there is a psychological aspect to the lip licking behavior.

== Classification ==
Lip licker's dermatitis which is a subtype of irritant contact cheilitis is caused by an exogenous factor rather than an endogenous one. Irritant contact cheilitis can be separated into different reaction types, so it is an umbrella term and further evaluations are usually needed to properly classify the presenting condition. Cheilitis can have many causes and subtypes, so creating a standard classification and diagnostic procedure is difficult. Since this disease is so broad, it is also best practice to have a multidisciplinary approach to it to rule out the possibility of other diseases that may present as irritant contact cheilitis. The results are usually reproducible but sometimes lack clinical manifestation.

Irritant contact cheilitis can also lead to eczematous dermatitis around the mouth as far as the tongue reaches.

Irritant contact cheilitis is a subtype of contact dermatitis. Contact dermatitis has many different subtypes that are caused by different irritants or exposures and have different immunological mechanisms. Since contact dermatitis is so broad, different subtypes can manifest simultaneously and presenting symptoms can overlap. Specific testing and evaluations using patch testing and allergy tests are best used to determine the irritant causing contact dermatitis.

== Signs and symptoms ==
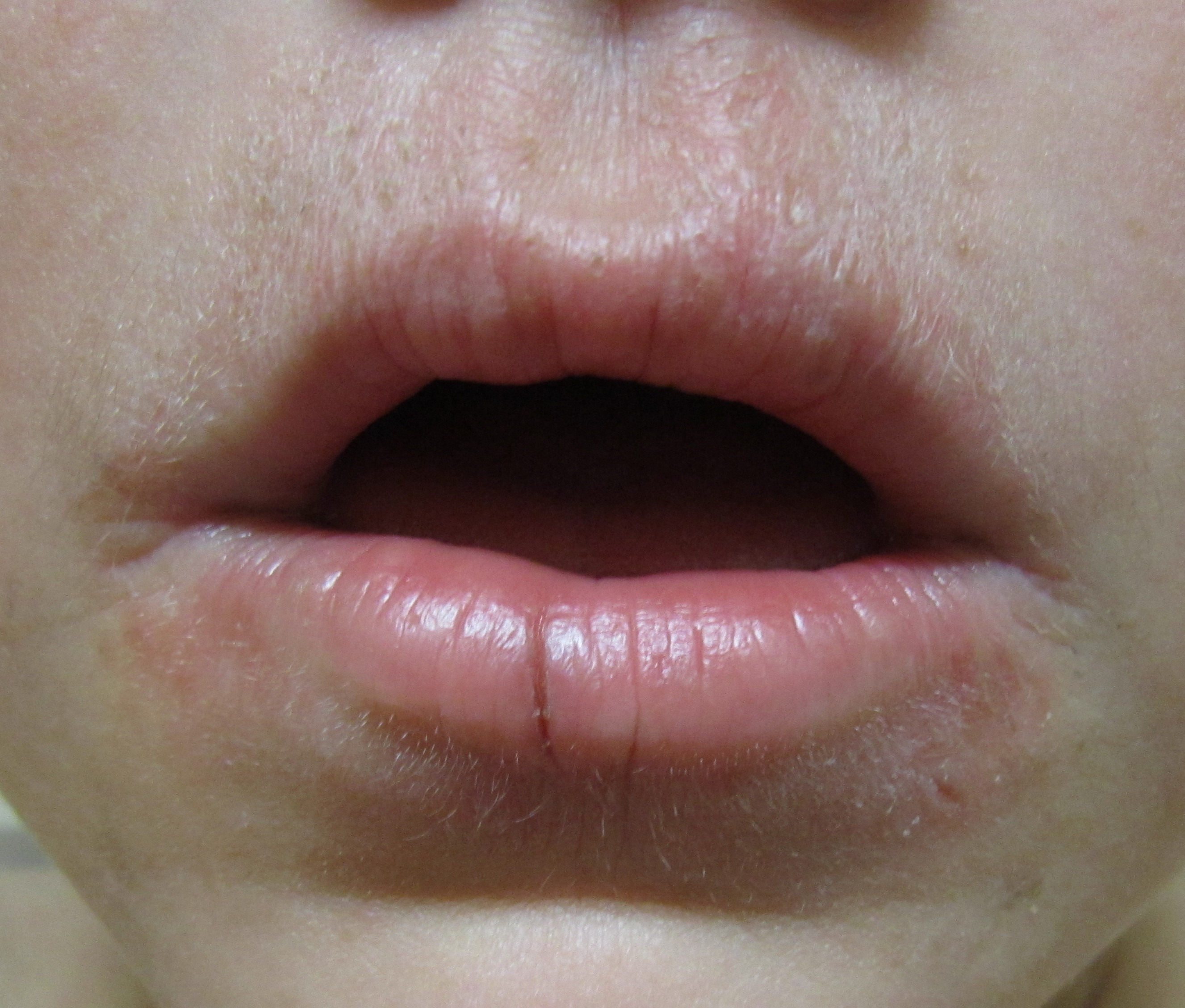
Lip licker's dermatitis

Redness around the lips in circumoral distribution with dryness and scale is typical. Chapping may also occur, especially in cold weather. If symptoms worsen due to persistent licking, cracked lips can occur usually on the lower lip.

Observation of the person's habitual behavior can also be a sign and symptom of lip licker's dermatitis. If repetitive lip licking or sucking of the lips is reported by the person or caregiver, this can support a diagnosis of dermatitis caused by lip licking.

== Prevalence ==
In the context of the broad diagnosis of eczematous cheilitis, lip-licker's dermatitis is not as common as endogenous cheilitis and allergic contact dermatitis. Among people with lip-licker's dermatitis, the most common risk factor is pre-existing conditions of the constitution of the lips, such as atopic dermatitis. Irritant contact dermatitis, under which lip-licker's dermatitis is classified, has been found to be most prevalent in caterers, furniture industry employees, hospital staff, hairdressers, industry workers in the chemical industry, dry cleaners, metal workers, and florists. This is due to the fact that they are all exposed to weak irritants over a long period of time. The most common irritants include alcohol, xylene, turpentine, ketones, metalworking fluids, sodium lauryl sulfate, alkalis, and acids.

=== Special populations ===
Habitual lip-licking has been reported to be common in mentally disabled persons, children, and the elderly population.

Lip licker's dermatitis mainly occurs in children, and they often are not aware that their lip-licking causes dermatitis and it may involve psychological aspects. In order to bring awareness, it is best to not directly point out their lips, but to take an indirect approach and ask an open question.

== Causes ==
Cold, dry, or hot wind and weather environments can harden and roughen up the red part of the lips, causing people to develop habitual lip licking to pick at the scales and flakiness that form. Lip chewing, thumb sucking, or excessive drooling can also initiate the inflammatory response.

Wind instrument players may also experience lip licker's dermatitis. However, it is important to differentiate this from allergic contact dermatitis which is also common in musicians who have a reaction to the ingredients common in varnishes for their instruments.

Compulsive licking of lips causing lip licker's dermatitis is also seen as a psychological disorder.

Persistent and continuous breathing from the mouth can cause dry lips and result in the temptation to repeatedly lick the lips with the aim to keep them moist.

Repeated licking removes the oily part on the surface of lips that prevents moisture loss. It results in a cycle of wetting and drying, which causes the redness, fissuring, scale, cracking of the lips, especially if lip biting is present. Excessive dryness to the protective oily part of the lip surface causes the skin barrier to be damaged with the increased skin permeability. As the response of the innate immune system, proinflammatory cytokines are released facing the damage to the lip. Digestive enzymes also causes additional inflammation to the exposed layers of the skin.

People with the high innate tendency to eczema are susceptible to irritant contact dermatitis.

== Diagnosis ==
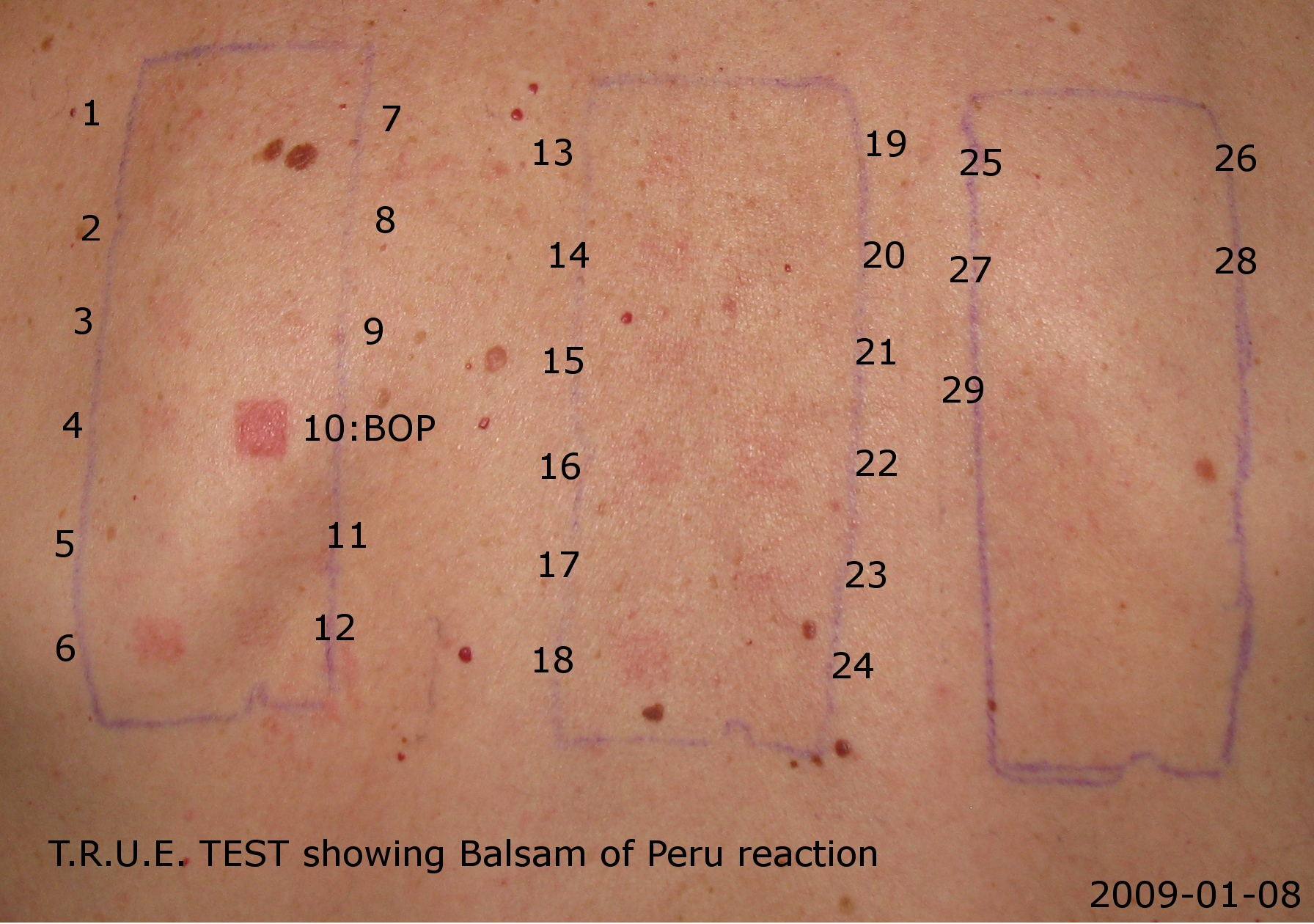
Allergy patch test showing allergic reaction to balsam of Peru

The diagnosis of lip licker's dermatitis is from taking history and inspection of the rash. It is important to distinguish it from allergic contact dermatitis and perioral dermatitis which are characterized by papules in the perioral area and sparing of the vermillion border, and worsened by topical steroids. Allergic contact dermatitis can be differentiated from irritant contact dermatitis by the presence of antigen-specific T cells since allergic contact dermatitis is a response of delayed type IV hypersensitivity mediated by T cells. Additionally, people with irritant contact dermatitis will present with a burning sensation rather than an itching sensation, which is different from allergic contact dermatitis. Allergy patch skin tests can be used to differentiate allergic contact dermatitis from irritant contact dermatitis and to identify causative allergens if dermatitis has allergic nature. This is done by inducing a small eczematous reaction by administering allergens under occlusions on intact skin. The T.R.U.E (Thin-layer Rapid-Use Epicutaneous) Test is a product with 35 allergens suspended in gels and is commonly used by dermatologists and allergists.

Differentiating between acute or chronic irritant dermatitis can also help in diagnosis and treatment. Chronic dermatitis is the more common form usually defined as more than 6 weeks of skin irritation. This is usually caused by regardless of moisturizer effectiveness, there is still frequent and repetitive exposure of irritant can exceed skin recovery time.

Lip licker's dermatitis can also be confused with angular cheilitis which can present as similar symptoms around the mouth as erythema or ulcerations. The difference is, lip licker's dermatitis often spares the corner of the mouth while angular cheilitis results in crusting at the corners of the mouth caused by irritant or allergy.

== Treatment ==
Prevention is an important component to the management of lip licker dermatitis. Breaking the cycle (dryness, then licking, followed by more dryness) is key to treatment, many people are unaware of the number of times they lick their lips every day. Some daily steps to take that will make a difference include adequate hydration and moisturizing lips with an ultraviolet-protecting lip balm. Common ingredients found in lip balm such as menthol, eucalyptus, cinnamon, and peppermint oil should be avoided if found to cause irritation.

Generous application of bland emollients can improve the rash and any flaking or peeling that can start occurring when the lips are irritated. However, complete resolution will not occur until the lip licking stops.

In the presence of severe irritation and dryness where cracks are present, the use of a thick emollient such as petroleum jelly can provide some relief and protection. Sometimes, unlike in perioral dermatitis, topical steroids may be used for a few days only for acute inflammation and if other methods were found unsuccessful. This is under supervision of a physician.

If no relief is found through these initial treatment methods or symptoms have worsened, allergy patch tests should be considered in order to explore the possibility that allergy cheilitis is the cause, in this case avoidance of the allergen would be the best course of treatment. Many people have been found to have hypersensitivity to dental products, ingredients in lip balms, and cosmetic problems in which case identifying the factors that are aggravating the skin and discontinuing their use can resolve the issue.

Lip licking behavior may have been caused by psychological disorders, so it is emphasized to identify the psychological nature of lip licking behavior. Cooperation of psychiatrists and dermatologists is recommended in treatment of lip licker's dermatitis.
