= Cheilitis =

Inflammation of the lips

- Other names: chapped lips
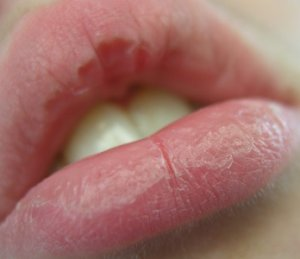
- Appearance of the lips due to bracing wind blowing in someone's face during a fast motorcycle ride
- Pronunciation: /kaɪˈlaɪtɪs/
- Specialty: Dermatology

Cheilitis, also called and known as chapped lips, is a medical condition characterized by inflammation of the lips. The inflammation may include the perioral skin (the skin around the mouth), the vermilion border, or the labial mucosa. The skin and the vermilion border are more commonly involved, as the mucosa is less affected by inflammatory and allergic reactions.

Cheilitis is a general term, and there are many recognized types and different causes. According to its onset and course, cheilitis can be either acute or chronic. Most cheilitis is caused by exogenous factors such as dryness (chapping) and acute sun exposure. Allergic tests may identify allergens that cause cheilitis.

== Chapped lips ==
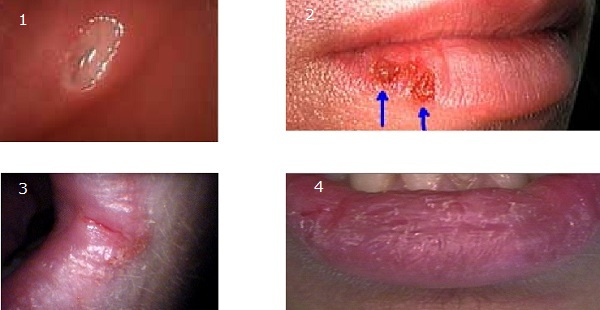
Photographic Comparison of: 1) a canker sore – inside the mouth, 2) herpes labialis, 3) angular cheilitis and 4) chapped lips

Chapped lips (also known as cheilitis simplex or common cheilitis) is characterized by the cracking, fissuring, and peeling of the skin of the lips, and is one of the most common types of cheilitis. While both lips may be affected, the lower lip is the most common site. There may also be burning or the formation of large, painful cracks when the lips are stretched. Chronic cheilitis simplex can progress to crusting and bleeding.

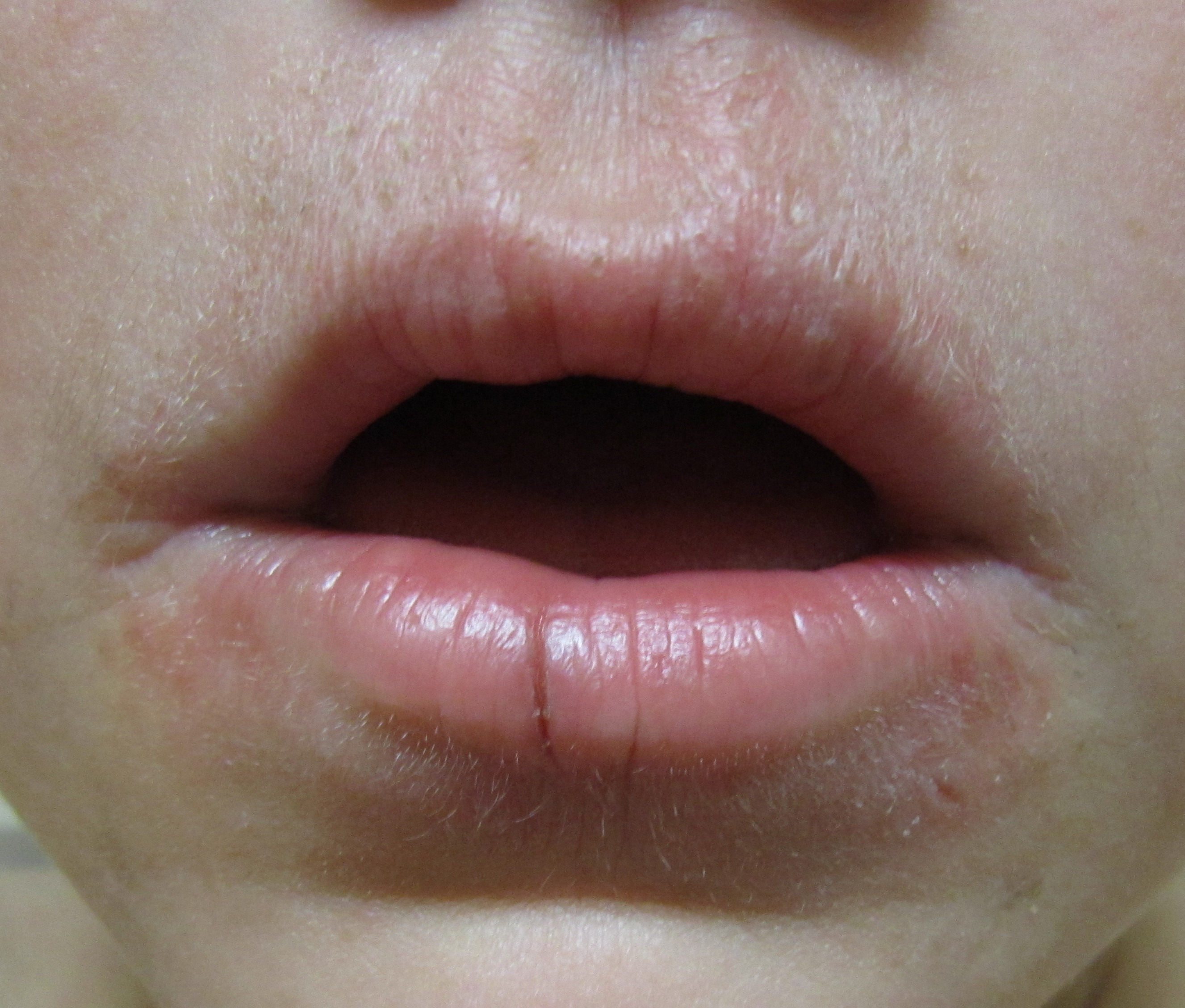
Lip licker's dermatitis, popularly known as perioral dermatitis, in a young male with a lip-licking habit. Note also deep fissures on lips.

Counterintuitively, constant licking of the lips causes drying and irritation, and eventually the mucosa splits or cracks. The lips have a greater tendency to dry out in cold, dry weather. Digestive enzymes present in the saliva may also irritate the lips, and the evaporation of the water in saliva saps moisture from them.

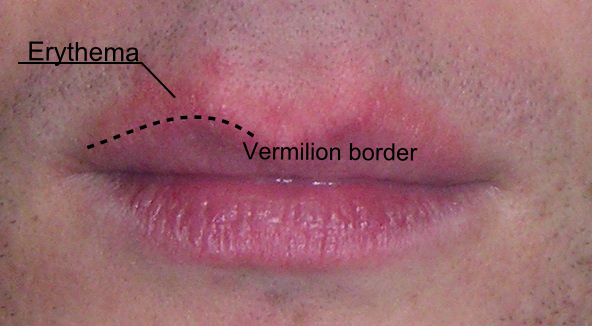
Erythema extending onto the perioral skin

Some children have a habit of sucking and chewing on the lower lip, producing a combination of cheilitis and a sharply demarcated perioral erythema.

Treatment is usually successful with barrier lubricants, such as lip salve or Vaseline. Medical grade (USP) lanolin accelerates repair of the lips, and it is used in some lip repair products.

Sometimes the term cheilitis simplex is used interchangeably with cheilitis in general; however, exfoliative cheilitis is also sometimes stated to be the equivalent of chapped lips.

== Actinic cheilitis ==
Also termed "solar cheilosis", actinic cheilitis is the result of chronic over-exposure to ultraviolet radiation in sunlight. It usually occurs on the lower lip, which is dry, scaling, and wrinkled grey-white in appearance. It is especially common in people with light skin types who live in sunny climates (e.g., Australians of European ancestry), and in persons who spend a lot of time outdoors. There is a small risk that actinic cheilitis can develop into squamous cell carcinoma in the long term, but lip cancer is usually noticed early and hence has a good prognosis compared to oral cancer generally.

== Angular cheilitis ==
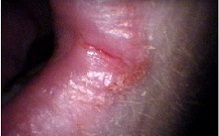
Angular cheilitis – inflammation of the corner of the mouth

Angular cheilitis (angular stomatitis, also known as cheilosis) is inflammation of one or both of the corners (angles) of the mouth. It is a fairly common condition and often affects elderly people.

There are many possible causes, including nutritional deficiencies (iron, B vitamins, folate), contact allergies, infections (Candida albicans, Staphylococcus aureus or β-hemolytic streptococci) and edentulism (often with overclosure of the mouth and concomitant denture-related stomatitis), and others.

== Eczematous cheilitis ==
Also termed "lip dermatitis", eczematous cheilitis is a diverse group of disorders which often have an unknown cause. Chronic eczematous reactions account for the majority of chronic cheilitis cases.

It is divided into endogenous (due to an inherent characteristic of the individual), and exogenous (where it is caused by an external agent). The main cause of endogenous eczematous cheilitis is atopic cheilitis (atopic dermatitis), and the main causes of exogenous eczematous cheilitis is irritant contact cheilitis (e.g., caused by a lip-licking habit) and allergic contact cheilitis. The latter is characterized by a dryness, fissuring, edema, and crusting. It affects females more commonly than males, in a ratio of about 9:1.

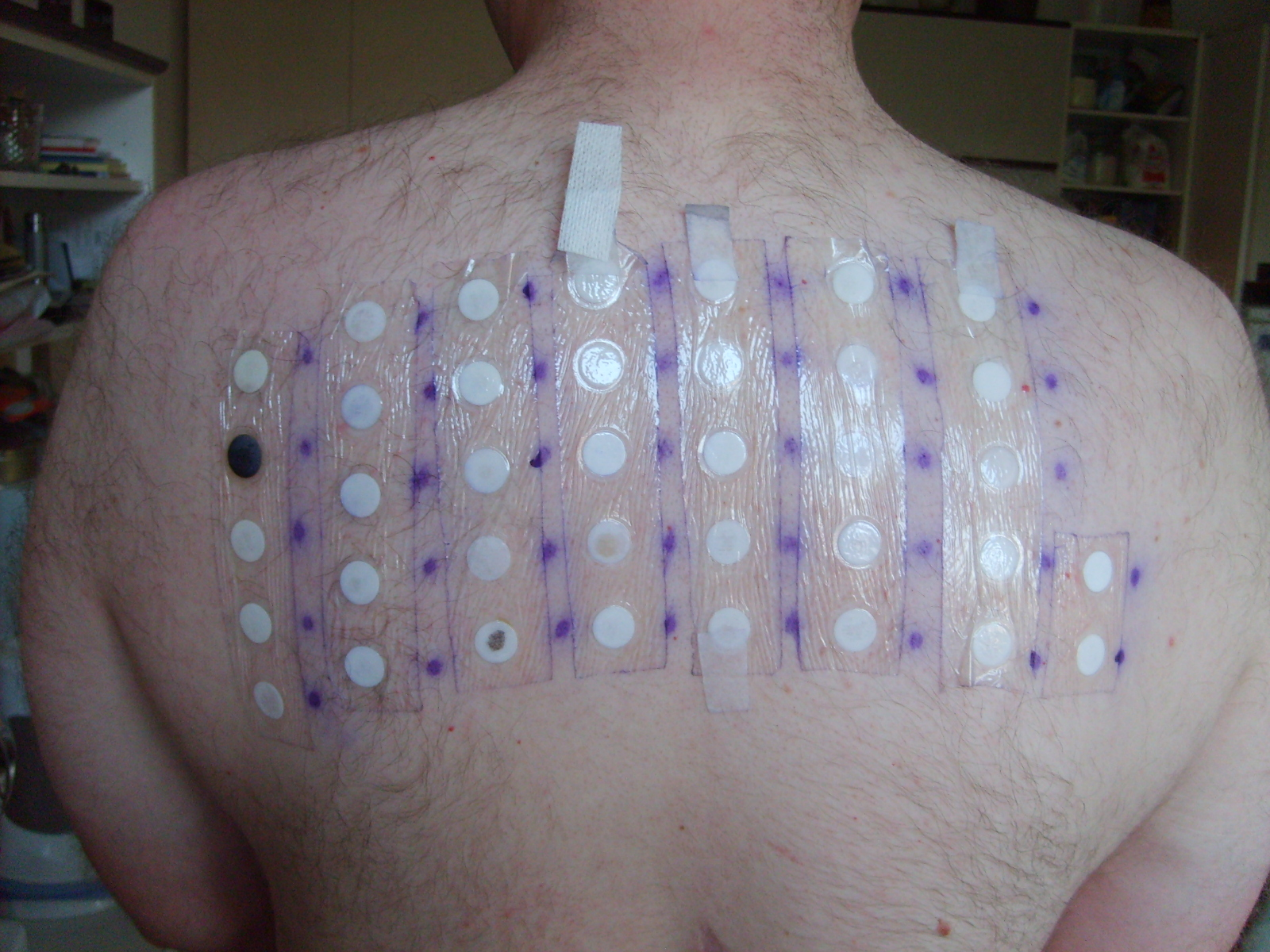
Patch test

The most common causes of allergic contact cheilitis is lip cosmetics, including lipsticks and lip balm, followed by toothpastes. A lipstick allergy can be difficult to diagnose in some cases as it is possible that cheilitis can develop without the person even wearing lipstick. Instead, small exposure such as kissing someone who is wearing lipstick is enough to cause the condition.

Allergy to Balsam of Peru can manifest as cheilitis. Allergies to metal, wood, or other components can cause cheilitis reactions in musicians, especially players of woodwind and brass instruments, e.g., the so-called "clarinetist's cheilitis", or "flutist's cheilitis". "Pigmented contact cheilitis" is one type of allergic cheilitis in which a brown-black discoloration of the lips develops. Patch testing is used to identify the substance triggering allergic contact cheilitis.

== Infectious cheilitis ==
Infectious cheilitis refers to cheilitis caused by infectious disease. The terms "Candidal cheilitis" and "bacterial cheilitis" are sometimes used, denoting the involvement of Candida organisms and bacterial species respectively. The term "cheilocandidiasis" describes exfoliative (flaking) lesions of the lips and the skin around the lips, and is caused by a superficial candidal infection due to chronic lip licking. Impetigo (caused by Streptococcus pyogenes and/or Staphylococcus aureus), can manifest as an exfoliative cheilitis-like appearance.

Herpes labialis (cold sore) is a common cause of infectious cheilitis. A lesion caused by recurrence of a latent herpes simplex infection can occur in the corner of the mouth, and be mistaken for other causes of angular cheilitis. In fact this is herpes labialis, and is sometimes termed "angular herpes simplex".

== Granulomatous cheilitis ==
Orofacial granulomatosis is enlargement of lips due to the formation of non-caseating granulomatous inflammation, which obstruct lymphatic drainage of the orofacial soft tissues, causing lymphedema. Essentially, granulomatous cheilitis refers to the lip swelling that accompanies this condition. "Median cheilitis" may be seen, which is fissuring in the midline of the lips due to the enlargement of the lips. Angular cheilitis may also be associated with orofacial granulomatosis.

A related condition is Melkersson–Rosenthal syndrome, a triad of facial palsy, chronic lip edema, and fissured tongue. "Miescher's cheilitis", and "granulomatous macrocheilitis", are synonyms of granulomatous cheilitis.

== Drug-related cheilitis ==
Common causes of drug-related cheilitis include Etretinate, Indinavir, Protease inhibitors, Vitamin A and Isotretinoin (a retinoid drug). Uncommon causes include Atorvastatin, Busulphan, Clofazimine, Clomipramine, Cyancobalamin, Gold, Methyldopa, Psoralens, Streptomycin, Sulfasalazine and Tetracycline. A condition called "drug-induced ulcer of the lip" is described as being characterized by painful or tender, well-defined ulcerations of the lip without induration. It is the result of oral administration of drugs, and the condition resolves when the drugs are stopped.

== Exfoliative cheilitis ==
Also termed "cheilitis exfoliativa" or "tic de levres", is an uncommon inflammatory condition of the vermilion zone of the lips, which become painful and crusted. There is continuous production and desquamation (shedding) of thick, brown scales of keratin. The keratin layer of the epidermis of the lips experiences a faster growth and death rate than normal and desquamates. When these scales are removed, a lip of normal appearance is revealed beneath, although there may be associated erythema and edema. The condition has not yet been attributed to any particular cause. Rarely are infections to blame. In some individuals, there is an association with stress, anxiety, depression or personality disorders. In one report, 87% of individuals had some form of psychiatric disturbance, and 47% had thyroid dysfunction, which in turn can cause psychiatric conditions like depression.

Some cases of exfoliative cheilitis are thought to represent factitious damage, termed "factitious cheilitis" or "artifactual cheilitis", and are related to repetitive lip picking or licking habits. This appears as crusting and ulceration caused by repetitive chewing and sucking of the lips. Some consider habitual lip licking or picking to be a form of nervous tic. This habit is sometimes termed perlèche (derived from the French word pourlècher meaning "to lick one's lips"). Factitious cheilitis is significantly more common in young females.

Exfoliative cheilitis has also been linked to HIV/AIDS. Management consists mostly of keeping the lips moist and the application of topical corticosteroids ranging from hydrocortisone to clobetasol. There have also been reports of using topical tacrolimus ointment.

Psoriasis of the lips appears similar; therefore, it is important to consider it as a possibility during diagnosis.

== Cheilitis glandularis ==
Chelitis glandularis is a rare inflammatory condition of the minor salivary glands, usually in the lower lip, which appears swollen and everted. There may also be ulceration, crusting, abscesses, and sinus tracts. It is an acquired disorder, but the cause is uncertain. Suspected causes include sunlight, tobacco, syphilis, poor oral hygiene and genetic factors. The openings of the minor salivary gland ducts become inflamed and dilated, and there may be mucopurulent discharge from the ducts. A previous classification suggested dividing cheilitis into 3 types based on severity, with the later stages involving secondary infection with bacteria, and increased ulceration, suppuration and swelling: Type 1, Simple; Type 2, Superficial suppurative ("Baelz's disease"); and Type 3, Deep suppurative ("cheilitis glandularis epostemetosa"). Cheilitis glandularis usually occurs in middle-aged and elderly males, and it carries a risk of malignant transformation to squamous cell carcinoma (18% to 35%). Preventative treatment such as vermilionectomy ("lip shave") is therefore the treatment of choice.

== Plasma cell cheilitis ==
Plasma cell cheilitis is a very rare presentation of a condition which more usually occurs on the gingiva (termed "plasma cell gingivitis") or sometimes the tongue. Plasma cell cheilitis appears as well defined, infiltrated, dark red plaque with a superficial lacquer-like glazing. Plasma cell cheilitis usually involves the lower lip. The lips appear dry, atrophic and fissured. Angular cheilitis is sometimes also present.

== Other causes ==
- Lupus erythematosus, sometimes termed "lupus cheilitis"
- Lichen planus
- Pemphigoid
- Xerostomia
