= Uranium dermatosis =

- Specialty: Dermatology

Uranium dermatosis is a cutaneous condition characterized by an irritant contact dermatitis and skin burns due to exposure to uranium.

== See also ==
- Beryllium granuloma
- List of cutaneous conditions
