= Defatting (medical) =

Dissolution of lipids in the skin

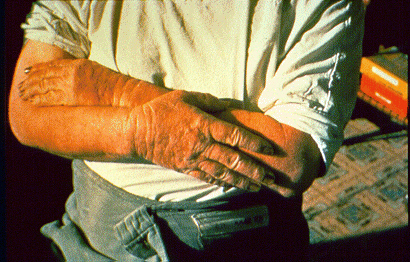
- Prolonged defatting of the skin can lead to dermatitis. Here the hands and wrists of a worker display chronic dermatitis resulting from long term exposure to kerosene.
- Specialty: Dermatology

Defatting is the chemical dissolving of dermal lipids, from the skin, on contact with defatting agents. This can result in water loss from the affected area and cause the whitening and drying of the skin which may result in cracking, secondary infection and chemical irritant contact dermatitis.

== Cause ==
Defatting is caused by the exposure of human skin to a chemical substance, including alcohols, detergents, chemical solvents and motor oil. Aliphatic compounds (commonly found in kerosene) cause defatting action, with lower-boiling point aliphatics having the greatest defatting action and therefore the most potential to cause dermatitis. Aromatic compounds, such as styrene, also have a defatting capacity.

== Prevention ==
Defatting can be prevented by wearing appropriate protective clothing such as gloves, lab coats and aprons when working regularly with defatting agents. Prolonged skin contact or chronic defatting of the skin increases the possibility of developing irritant contact dermatitis and has the potential to worsen pre-existing skin conditions. Patients with chronic dermatitis are advised to use non-irritating soaps and dishwashing liquids sparingly and to choose those with a neutral pH and minimal defatting capability.
