= Perioral dermatitis =

- Other names: Periorificial dermatitis
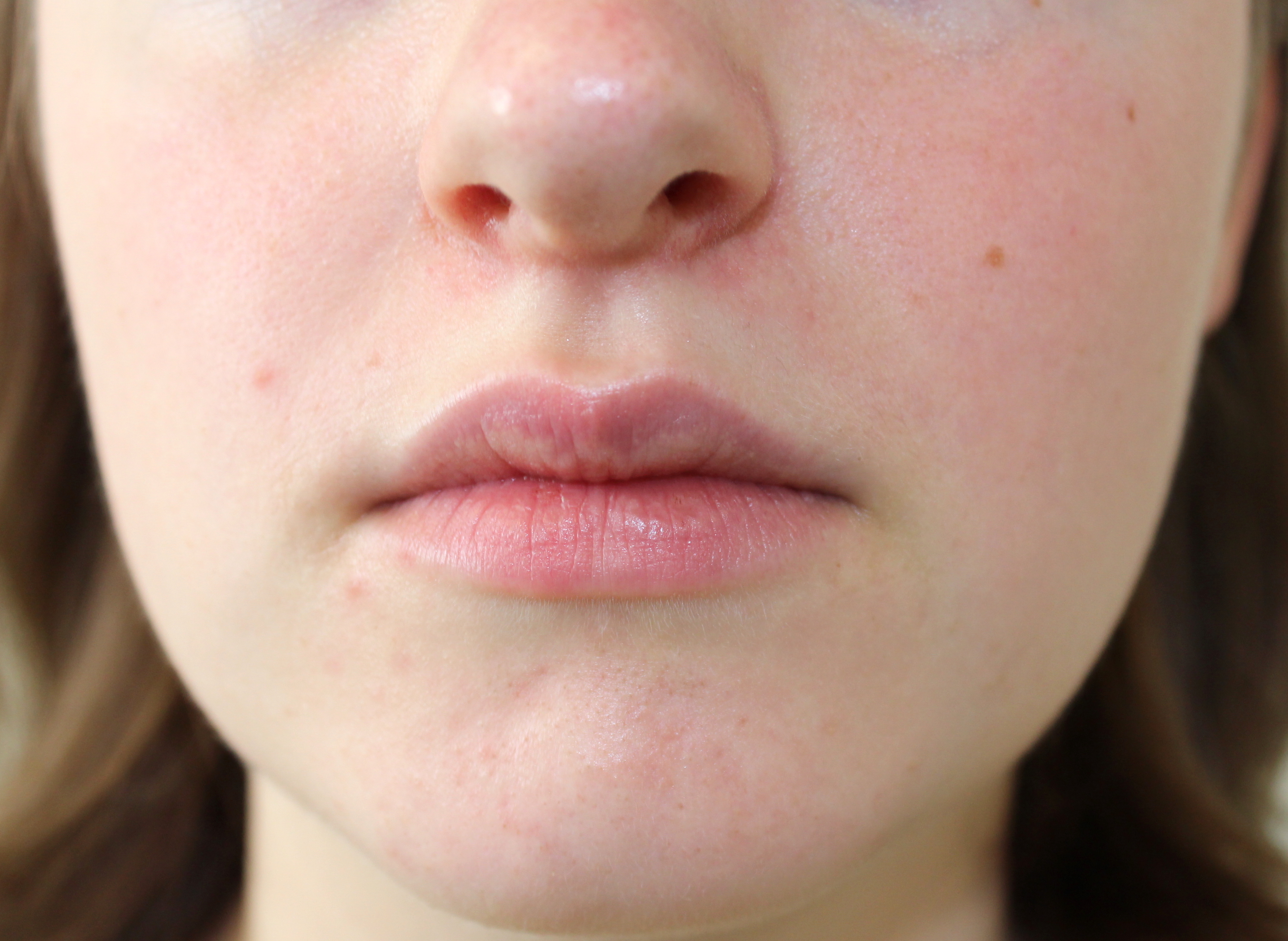
- Papules around mouth and nostrils with some background redness and sparing of vermillion border
- Specialty: Dermatology
- Symptoms: Papules, pustules, red skin
- Complications: Skin infection
- Causes: Unknown
- Risk factors: Topical steroids, cosmetics, moisturiser
- Diagnostic method: Based on symptom and appearance
- Differential diagnosis: Rosacea, acne
- Treatment: None, tetracycline

Perioral dermatitis, also known as periorificial dermatitis, is a common type of inflammatory skin rash. Symptoms include multiple small (1–2 mm) bumps and blisters sometimes with background redness and scale, localized to the skin around the mouth and nostrils. Less commonly, the eyes and genitalia may be involved. It can be persistent or recurring, and resembles particularly rosacea and to some extent acne and allergic dermatitis. The term "dermatitis" is a misnomer because this is not an eczematous process.

The cause is unclear. Topical steroids are associated with the condition and moisturizers and cosmetics may contribute. The underlying mechanism may involve blockage of the skin surface followed by subsequent excessive growth of skin flora. Fluoridated toothpaste and some micro-organisms, including Candida, may also worsen the condition, but their roles in this condition are unclear. It is considered a disease of the hair follicle with biopsy samples showing microscopic changes around the hair follicle. Diagnosis is based on symptoms.

Treatment is typically by stopping topical steroids, changing cosmetics, and in more severe cases, taking tetracyclines by mouth. Stopping steroids may initially worsen the rash. The condition is estimated to affect 0.5-1% of people each year in the developed world. Up to 90% of those affected are women between the ages of 16 and 45 years, though it also affects children and the elderly, and has an increasing incidence in men.

== History ==
The disorder appears to have made a sudden appearance in 1957 with a case of 'light sensitive seborrhoeid', which is said to be the first nearest description of the condition. By 1964, the condition in adults was widely known as perioral dermatitis, but without clear clinical criteria. In 1970, the condition was recognized in children. Whether all rashes around the mouth are perioral dermatitis has been frequently debated. That this condition should be renamed periorificial dermatitis has been proposed. Darrell Wilkinson was a British dermatologist who gave one of the earliest 'definitive' descriptions of 'perioral dermatitis' and noted that the condition was not always associated with the use of fluoridated steroid creams.

== Signs and symptoms ==
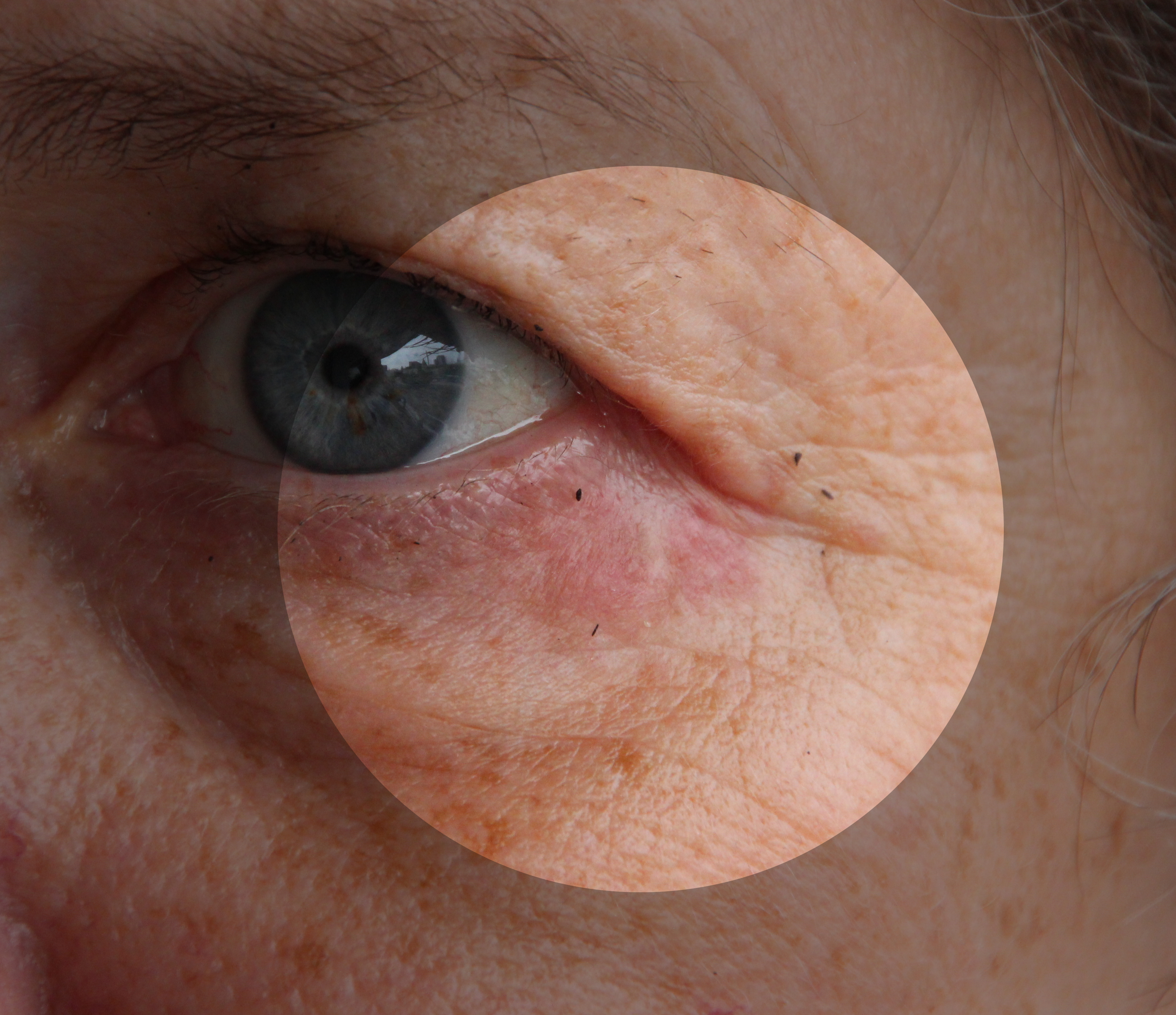
Periorificial dermatitis

A stinging and burning sensation with rash is often felt and noticed, but itching is less common. Often, the rash is steroid responsive, initially improving with application of a topical steroid. The redness caused by perioral dermatitis has been associated with variable levels of depression and anxiety.

Initially, there may be small pinpoint papules on either side of the nostrils. Multiple small (1-2mm) papules and pustules then occur around the mouth, nose, and sometimes cheeks. The area of skin directly adjacent to the lips, also called the vermillion border, is spared and looks normal. There may be some mild background redness and occasional scale. These areas of skin are felt to be drier and therefore there is a tendency to moisturize them more frequently. Hence, they do not tolerate drying agents well, and they often worsen the rash.

Perioral dermatitis is also known by other names, including rosacea-like dermatoses, periorofacial dermatitis, and periorificial dermatitis. Unlike rosacea, which involves mainly the nose and cheeks, there is no telangiectasia in perioral dermatitis. Rosacea is also often present, especially in older people. Acne can be distinguished by the presence of comedones and by its wider distribution on the face and chest. There are no comedones in perioral dermatitis.

A variant of perioral dermatitis called granulomatous perioral dermatitis (GPD) is often seen in prepubertal children or in darker-skin phenotypes. GPD lesions may appear yellow on a diascopy. Patients report irritation but are usually asymptomatic. For children with GPD, a skin biopsy showing a granulomatous infiltrate is needed to confirm diagnosis in an atypical patient. If the GPD is mild, treatment is not mandatory.

== Causes ==
The exact cause of perioral dermatitis is unclear; however, some associations are suspected. There have been clinical trials examining the link between perioral dermatitis and steroids, infections, and typical facial products. These factors may play a role in the development of perioral dermatitis. Although light exposure has been discounted as a causal factor, some reports of perioral dermatitis have been made by some patients receiving Psoralen and ultraviolet A therapy. An underlying cause can not always be known for patients as the exact mechanism of action to develop perioral dermatitis is not known.

=== Corticosteroids ===
Perioral dermatitis can occur with corticosteroids. Corticosteroids are anti-inflammatory medications used to reduce swelling and redness caused by the body. There are different forms of steroids, many of which can contribute to the development of perioral dermatitis. Some of these are topical corticosteroids, oral corticosteroids, and inhaled corticosteroids. Clinical trials have shown a correlation between these corticosteroids; however, a direct cause has not been confirmed. The highest link seems to be with topical corticosteroids in comparison to the others, and there seems to be a higher chance of the development of perioral dermatitis with stronger steroids. It has also been seen that chronic use of steroids shows a higher rate of developing perioral dermatitis. Discontinuing the steroids often initially worsens the dermatitis, which leads to some conflicting beliefs, as some people believe the steroids were initially controlling the condition. Perioral dermatitis tends to occur on the drier parts of the face and can be aggravated by drying agents, including topical benzoyl peroxide, tretinoin, and lotions with an alcohol base.Reports of perioral dermatitis in renal transplant recipients treated with oral corticosteroids and azathioprine have been documented.

=== Infections ===
Topical corticosteroids may lead to an increase in microorganism density in the hair follicle. Microorganisms are small living things that a person is not able to see without a microscope. Normally, people have microorganisms all over their bodies, but corticosteroids can change the type and amount. This may lead to an infection. The role of infectious agents such as Candida species, Demodex folliculorum, and fusobacteria has not been confirmed, but could be potential causes for development as well. There are different types of the infections such as bacterial, yeast, and parasitic. From different clinical trials, it seems that a bacterial infection is more likely to lead to perioral dermatitis than the other types.

=== Cosmetics ===
Cosmetics play an important role as potential causal factors for perioral dermatitis. Cosmetics in this case include a variety of products that are applied to the face such as moisturizer, foundation, and sunscreen. It is especially seen when these products contain petroleum, paraffin, or isopropyl myristate. Applying large quantities of a moisturizing creams regularly causes persistent hydration of the layer which may cause impairment and occlusion of the barrier function, irritation of the hair follicle, and proliferation of skin flora. Occlusion is the sealing of the moisture. Proliferation is when cells continue to divide to create new healthy cells. This is a process that cells of all kinds normally and often do. For some people, this act of moisturizing excessively can affect the typical proliferation of skin flora. Skin flora are the typical bacteria and cells that sit on a person's face. Transepidermal water loss is also seen as associated with perioral dermatitis. Transepidermal water loss is water that is lost from the inside of the body by going through the skin to the outside world. There are associations that water loss is greater in older adults, but perioral dermatitis can still occur in younger people. Barrier dysfunction is seen as a large cosmetic association with perioral dermatitis. Combining this with night cream and foundation significantly increases the risk of perioral dermatitis 13-fold. In a similar fashion, foundation and sunscreen also create extra occlusive layers that may affect the skin. Physical sunscreens also have been seen to have an associations These are potential associations to perioral dermatitis and thoughts of how it may cause perioral dermatitis; however, the exact pathology is still unknown. This also does not mean that those who use these products will be sure to develop perioral dermatitis.

=== Other Potential Causes ===
Various other potential factors are suspected to cause or worsen perioral dermatitis; however, sufficient research has not been conducted to demonstrate a link as strong as that with corticosteroids. Hormonal changes may be linked to causing perioral dermatitis. Oral contraceptives (birth control pills) may also have a link, as they significantly impact the hormonal balance of the people taking them. Hormones are natural chemicals in the body that act as messengers by relaying information to different parts of the body. The body normally regulates these levels; however, they can be changed by other factors such as oral contraceptives. Gastrointestinal (GI) changes may also be linked with perioral dermatitis. The GI system includes all the organs for food to be broken down, absorbed, and excreted out of the body. The condition may be potentially worsened by fluoridated toothpaste, excessive wind, or heat. The possibility of an association with wearing a veil has been documented as well. Some other miscellaneous factors include emotional stress, malabsorption, and latex gloves.

Perioral dermatitis can also be caused by other factors, such as stress, oily secretions, and fluid intake, all of which were impacted as COVID cases increased, which further increased the rates of wearing masks. This, in turn, resulted in increased levels of stress and oil secretions along the face and decreased water intake.

== Pathophysiology ==
The pathophysiology of perioral dermatitis is related to disease of the hair follicle, as is now included in the ICD-11, due to be finalized in 2018. Lip licker's dermatitis or perioral irritant contact dermatitis due to lip-licking is considered a separate disease categorized under irritant contact dermatitis due to saliva.

Perioral dermatitis is frequently histologically similar to rosacea, with the two conditions overlapping considerably. There is a lymphohistiocytic infiltrate with perifollicular localization and marked granulomatous inflammation. Occasionally, perifollicular abscesses may be present when pustules and papules are the dominant clinical findings.

There is a possible discovery of new information that perioral dermatitis develops due to damage to the skin barrier in the facial area, which may lead to the patient's skin becoming exposed to both internal and external factors that contribute to the development of perioral dermatitis.

== Diagnosis ==
A diagnosis of perioral dermatitis is typically made based on the rash's characteristics. A skin biopsy is usually not required to make the diagnosis, but it can be helpful to rule out other skin diseases that may resemble perioral dermatitis. Extended patch testing may also be useful to rule out allergic contact causes. If the skin biopsy shows signs of other components such as bacteria, the healthcare workers can do further lab testing, such as culture or other tests like a diascopy.

Other skin diseases that may resemble perioral dermatitis include:

- Rosacea
- Acne vulgaris
- Seborrheic dermatitis
- Allergic contact dermatitis
- Irritant contact dermatitis
- Angular cheilitis
- Sarcoidosis
- Lip licker's cheilitis
- Demodex folliculitis
- Tinea faciei
- Syringomas

== Treatment ==
Multiple treatment regimes are available, and treatment algorithms have been proposed.

Treatment regimens are advised to treat perioral dermatitis using the lowest possible dose for antibiotics and other therapies.

Most treatment plans were developed through trial and error. Treatment plans usually consist of a systemic treatment such as an oral antibiotic or a topical treatment like metronidazole.

However, many factors can contribute to the development of perioral dermatitis in patients, as well as the severity of the disease. This can lead to develop many treatment plans that would best cater to the patient.

Perioral dermatitis usually resolves within a few months without medication by limiting the use of irritants, including products with fragrance, cosmetics, benzoyl peroxide, occlusive sunscreens, and various acne products. This is called zero treatment. Topical corticosteroids should be stopped entirely if possible. Abrupt discontinuation of a topical corticosteroid may lead to rebound flares that can be worse than the primary dermatitis. If the flare proves intolerable, temporary use of a less potent topical corticosteroid can often be helpful. Slowly reducing the use of topical corticosteroids over time can help prevent rebound flares.

Topical retinoids and benzoyl peroxide are potentially irritating products that can cause skin inflammation and should be avoided.

=== Medication ===
Several medications, either applied directly to the skin or taken by mouth, may speed recovery. These include tetracycline, doxycycline, and erythromycin. Tetracycline is given at a daily dosage of 250 to 500 mg twice a day for 4 to 8 weeks. Gastrointestinal issues, diarrhea, and photosensitivity are possible short term side effects when taking tetracycline. Sarecycline, a narrow-spectrum tetracycline antibiotic, has a lower potential of causing bacterial resistance and gastrointestinal issues compared to other tetracycline medications. Possible side effects of Sarecycline include nausea and sunburn, which are very rare. Pregnant women and pediatric patients can not take tetracycline due to possible harm to the fetus and severe staining of developing teeth. Erythromycin is often given as an alternative for those who cannot take tetracycline, given at a daily dosage of 250 to 500 mg. Erythromycin may be used as a cream. Doxycycline is a second-generation tetracycline with improved absorption and a broader antibacterial spectrum. Doxycycline is most often the first antibiotic drug choice, given at a daily dosage of 100 mg for up to a month before considering tapering off or stopping. Sometimes, a longer duration of low doses of doxycycline is required. Possible side effects of doxycycline include gastrointestinal issues and irritation in the esophagus.

Metronidazole is less effective, but it is available in a gel and can be applied twice daily. For pediatric patients, metronidazole can be used as an alternative to tetracycline. Metronidazole comes in various concentrations ranging from 0.75% to 2%. Higher-concentration metronidazole did not produce shorter cure times. If the perioral dermatitis was triggered by a topical steroid, then pimecrolimus cream has been suggested as effective in improving symptoms. However, this has also been documented to cause the condition. Topical pimecrolimus is often used in treating corticosteroid-induced perioral dermatitis due to its being a non-steroid-based cream. Pimecrolimus is generally well tolerated, with a rare side effect of a burning sensation at the application site.

Topical adapalene has been reported to resolve a case of perioral dermatitis in 4 weeks without any side effects. The dose used was 1% adapalene gel once a day at night. The patient did not have a recurrence during the 8-month follow-up period.

The most common medications to treat perioral dermatitis are oral tetracycline, pimecrolimus cream, and azelaic gel. However, some of these medications can't be used for prolonged periods, otherwise they will no longer be effective against the disease. For example, the use of pimecrolimus cream for more than four weeks will be ineffective, while the use of azelaic acid gel for more than six weeks will be ineffective. While these two medications previously mentioned decrease in effectiveness after a certain period, oral tetracycline, on the other hand, have been shown to have decreased effectiveness if used before twenty days of disease diagnosis.

While there may be other topical medications that can be effective against perioral dermatitis, such as erythromycin emulsion or metronidazole cream, studies have shown that their effectiveness varied among different randomized controlled trials. As a result, these two topical medications, amongst others, may not be the ideal solution for perioral dermatitis.

For rarer cases, cefcapene pivoxil hydrochloride, a beta-lactam antibiotic, has been used to treat perioral dermatitis presumably caused by Fusobacteria. Improvement was visible in 1 to 2 weeks and cured in 2 to 5 weeks. Isotretinoin was used in treating granulomatous perioral dermatitis at a dose of 0.7 mg/kg/day for 20 weeks. However, the patient was also taking a series of combination therapies. Isotretinoin also requires long-term monitoring for potential side effects.

More studies lately show other possible solutions to use for the treatment, one such study shows the use of the TRPV1 inhibitor 4-t-butylcyclohexanol. The TPRV receptor activates as a defense against possible pain, like inflammatory reactions, which could lead to the possible development of perioral dermatitis. The study presents that the symptoms of perioral dermatitis in patients take it shows improvement within 8 weeks.

When giving patients their medication, healthcare workers must be aware of the possibility of the perioral dermatitis returning to the patient again, as well as exacerbation. If the perioral dermatitis comes back again, the medication that they took prior may not work the second time around, so the healthcare workers may need to create a secondary treatment plan around the return of the disease.

== Prognosis ==
Perioral dermatitis is likely to resolve with short courses of antibiotics, but if left untreated, it can persist for years and become chronic.

In some cases, it can be resolved for the patient to stop taking external factors that may contribute to the development of perioral dermatitis.

Improvement with tetracyclines is usually seen after 4 days and significantly so after 2 weeks. In severe cases, longer periods of treatment may be required to achieve cosmetic satisfaction.

== Epidemiology ==
Most commonly in females between the ages of 16 and 45 years, perioral dermatitis also occurs equally in all racial and ethnic backgrounds. This includes children as young as three months, and is increasingly reported in males. In children, females are more likely to be affected. It has an incidence of up to 1% in developed countries. While perioral dermatitis is more prevalent amongst young females compared to male, the reason behind why is unclear.

In adults, women are more likely to be affected than men. The most affected age group is those in their twenties or thirties. However, in children, the most affected populations are those before puberty, and boys are more affected than girls.

Amongst the few adult men who find themselves diagnosed with perioral dermatitis, it has been shown in multiple studies that the reason behind it is due to their taking volatile alkyl nitrates, an inhaled product used to relax muscles.

== Impacts ==
Many individuals who have perioral dermatitis, amongst other skin issues, have an increased risk of experiencing mental health issues, such as depression, anxiety, and stress. This is particularly more prevalent in adolescents, compared to adults, due to the presence of more social stigmas during one's teen years as opposed to one's adulthood.

Individuals who use topical steroids long past standard treatment plans or chronically may increase the risk of developing other severe diseases, such as severe dermatitis.

== See also ==
- Childhood granulomatous periorificial dermatitis
- Seborrhoeic dermatitis
- Eczema herpeticum, a condition that primarily manifests in childhood
