= Periorbital dermatitis =

- Other names: Periocular dermatitis
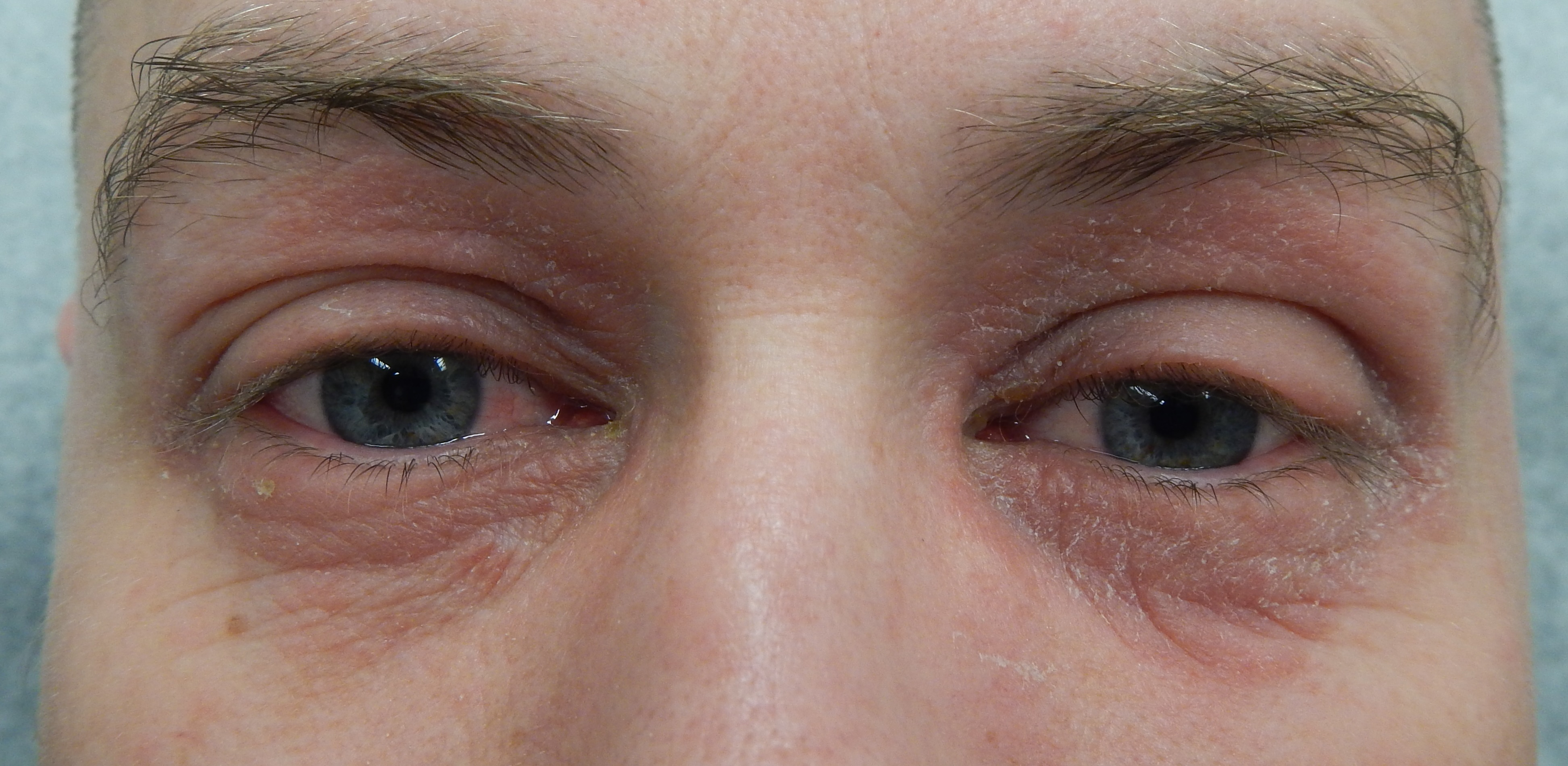
- Periorbital dermatitis
- Specialty: Dermatology

Periorbital dermatitis is a skin condition, a variant of perioral dermatitis, occurring on the lower eyelids and skin adjacent to the upper and lower eyelids.

== See also ==
- Granulomatous perioral dermatitis
- Eye disease
