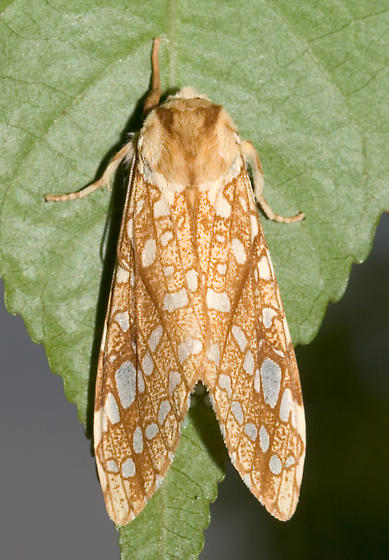

Conservation status
- Secure (NatureServe)

Scientific classification
- Kingdom: Animalia
- Phylum: Arthropoda
- Clade: Pancrustacea
- Class: Insecta
- Order: Lepidoptera
- Superfamily: Noctuoidea
- Family: Erebidae
- Subfamily: Arctiinae
- Genus: Lophocampa
- Species: L. caryae

Binomial name
- Lophocampa caryae Harris, 1841

Synonyms
- Halysidota caryae

= Lophocampa caryae =

Species of moth

Lophocampa caryae, the hickory tiger moth, hickory tussock moth, or hickory halisidota, is a moth in the family Erebidae and the tribe Arctiini, the tiger moths. The species is widely distributed in the eastern half of North America. In other species in this family, the caterpillars acquire chemical defenses from their host plants, so they are potentially toxic or unpalatable, but despite anecdotal claims that this species may also be venomous, no venom has yet been isolated or identified; adverse reactions are characterized as irritant contact dermatitis.

== Life cycle ==
There is one generation per year.

=== Larva ===
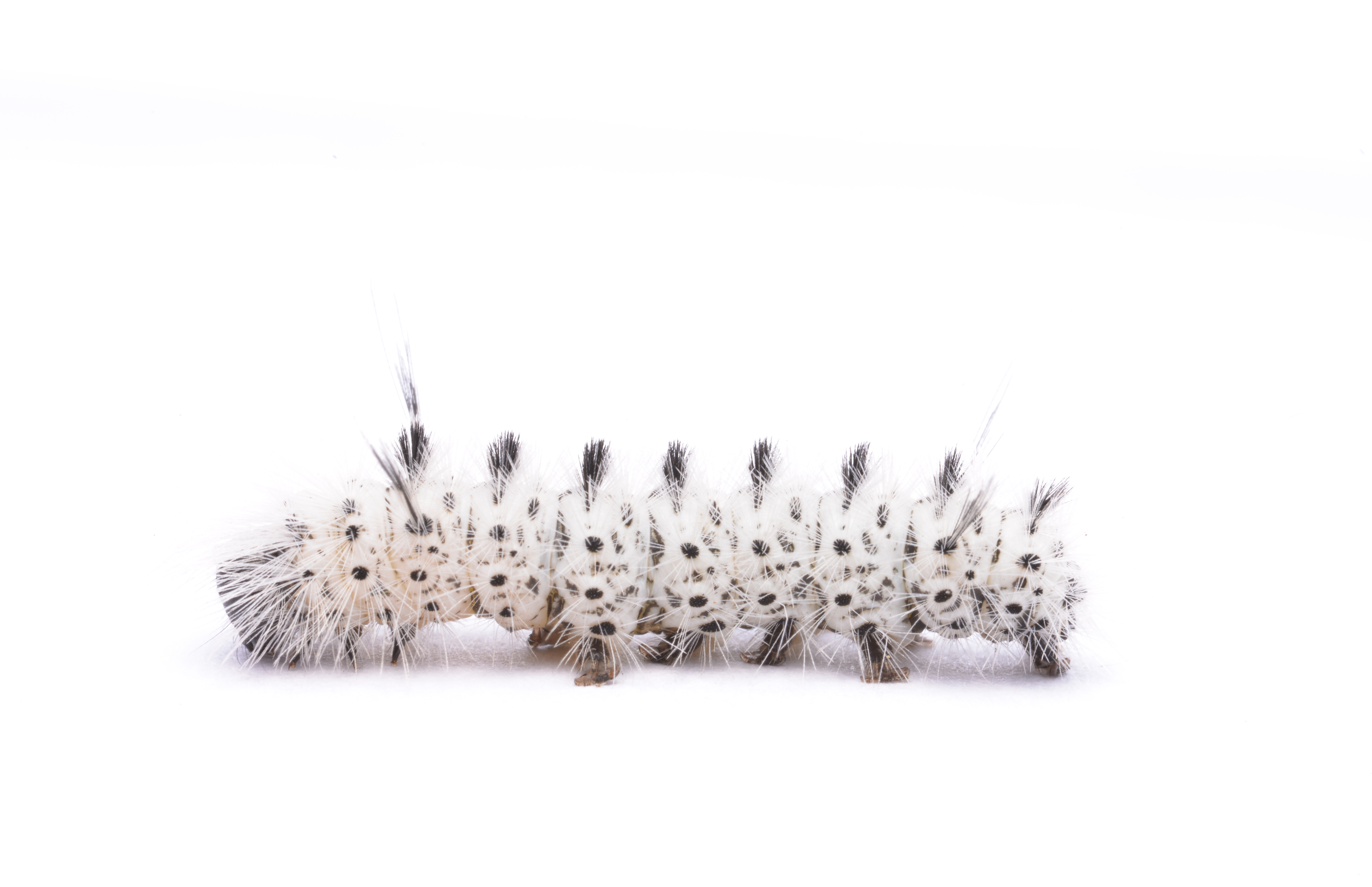
Larva (side view)

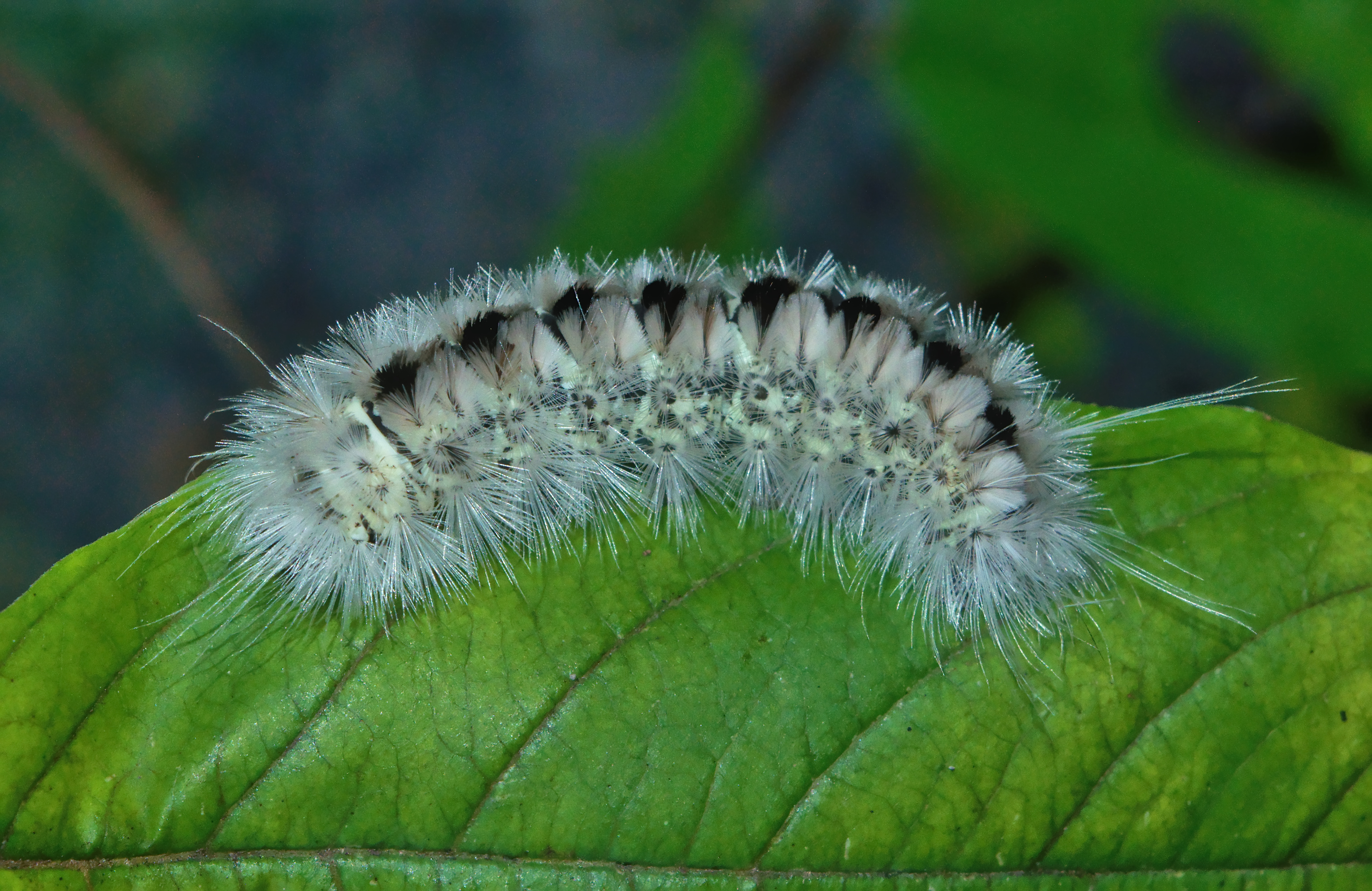
Larva (top view)

The larva, a caterpillar, is completely covered in long, hairlike setae arranged in spreading tufts. Most are white, but there are black tufts along the middle of the back, and four long black hair pencils, two near the front, and two near the back. There are black spots along the sides, and the head capsule is black. The hairs cause itchy rashes (contact dermatitis) in many people, particularly those prone to allergies, and may resemble exposure to urushiol. They are microscopically barbed and may rarely cause serious medical complications if they are transferred from the hands to the eyes, but in over 350 documented cases, most were asymptomatic within 24 hours, and none involved anaphylaxis.

The later-instar caterpillars are seen between July and October. They feed in groups of about 100 or so in the early instars, skeletonizing leaves. Older larvae are solitary. They grow up to 4.5 centimeters long before pupating. Larvae primarily feed on hickory, pecan, and walnuts, but will also eat ash, elm, oak, willow, and other plants. They may occasionally cause local defoliation of nut trees, but high densities do not last long enough to cause significant damage.

=== Pupa ===
The cocoon is loose and has setae woven into it. It overwinters in the leaf litter.

=== Adult ===
The adult moth flies in May and June. The forewings are yellowish-brown marked with white splotches, reminiscent of stained glass. The hindwings are mostly white. The body is hairy and pale brown.
