= Allergic contact dermatitis =

Inflammation of the skin due to contact with an allergen

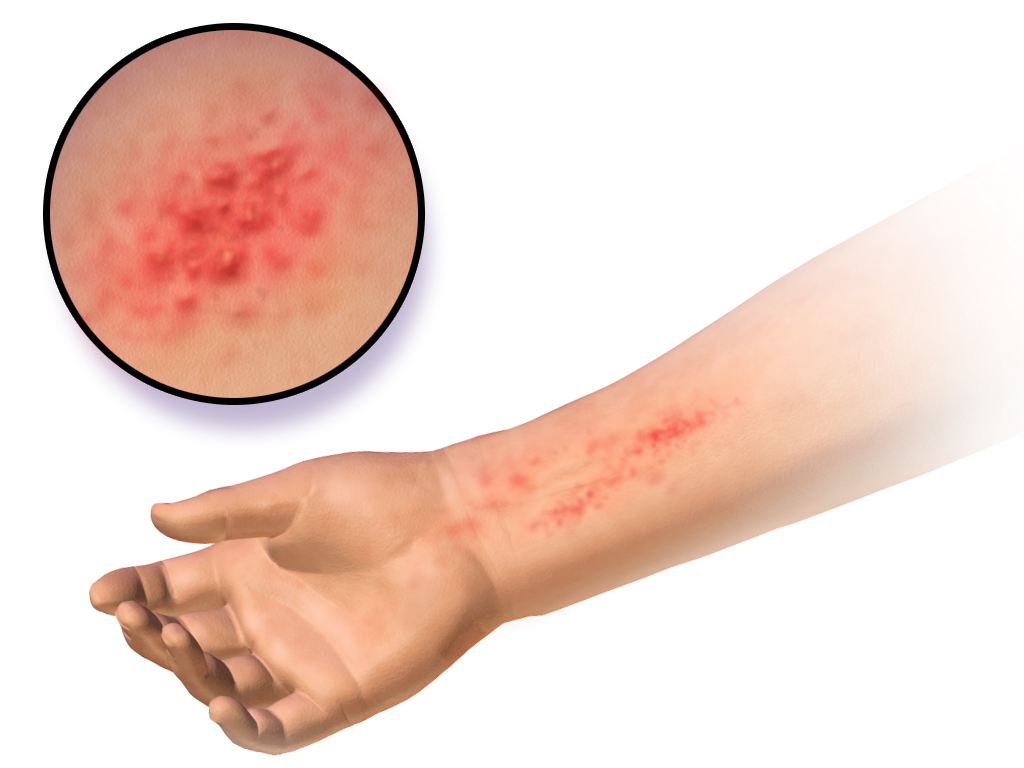
- Illustration of allergic contact dermatitis
- Specialty: Dermatology, immunology

Allergic contact dermatitis (ACD) is a form of contact dermatitis that is the manifestation of a type IV hypersensitivity (delayed hypersensitivity) response caused by contact with a substance; the other type being irritant contact dermatitis (ICD). It differs from classical allergic reactions, which are type I hypersensitivity reactions.

Although less common than ICD, ACD is accepted to be the most prevalent form of immunotoxicity found in humans. By its hypersensitive nature, this form of contact dermatitis is atypical within the population. The mechanisms by which these reactions occur are complex, with many levels of fine control. Their immunology centres on the interaction of immunoregulatory cytokines and discrete subpopulations of T lymphocytes.

== Signs and symptoms ==
The symptoms of allergic contact dermatitis are very similar to those caused by irritant contact dermatitis, which makes the first even harder to diagnose. The first sign of allergic contact dermatitis is the presence of a rash or skin lesion at the site of exposure. Depending on the type of allergen causing it, the rash can ooze, drain, or crust, and it can become raw, scaled, or thickened. Also, it is possible that the skin lesion does not take the form of a rash, but it may include papules, blisters, vesicles, or even a simple red area. The main difference between the rash caused by allergic contact dermatitis and the one caused by irritant contact dermatitis is that the latter tends to be confined to the area where the trigger touched the skin, whereas in allergic contact dermatitis, the rash is more likely to be spread to other parts of the skin as a result of touching or scratching the originally affected area and then touching or scratching other parts of the body, especially the face. Another characteristic of the allergic contact dermatitis rash is that it usually appears after a day or two after exposure to the allergen, unlike irritant contact dermatitis that appears immediately after the contact with the trigger.

Other symptoms may include itching, skin redness or inflammation, localized swelling, and the area may become more tender or warmer. If left untreated, the skin may darken and become leathery and cracked. Pain can also be present. Dermatitis can occur anywhere on the skin, but is most common on the hands (22% of people), scattered across the body (18%), or on the face (17%). Although distinct from irritant dermatitis in its mechanism, the two frequently occur together. The inflammation caused by the irritant dermatitis results in more ready penetration of allergens through a damaged skin barrier, leading to allergy. This is particularly seen, for instance, in hairdressers, who as a profession are highly likely to develop irritant dermatitis, but also frequently go on to develop allergy to chemicals that they are in contact with.

The rash and other symptoms typically occur 24 to 48 hours after the exposure; in some cases, the rash may persist for weeks. Once an individual has developed a skin reaction to a certain substance it is most likely that they will have it for the rest of their life, and the symptoms will reappear when in contact with the allergen.

== Cause ==
Common allergens implicated include the following:

- Bacitracin – topical antibiotic found by itself, or as Polysporin or Triple Antibiotic
- Balsam of Peru (Myroxylon pereirae) – used in food and drink for flavoring, in perfumes and toiletries for fragrance, and in medicine and pharmaceutical items for healing properties; derived from tree resin. It may also be a component of artificial vanilla and/or cinnamon flavorings.
- Chromium – used in the tanning of leather. Also a component of uncured cement/mortar, facial cosmetics and some bar soaps.
- Cobalt chloride – metal found in medical products; hair dye; antiperspirant; metal-plated objects such as snaps, buttons or tools; and in cobalt blue pigment
- Colophony (Rosin) – rosin, sap, or sawdust typically from spruce or fir trees
- Formaldehyde – preservative with multiple uses, e.g., in paper products, paints, medications, household cleaners, cosmetic products, and fabric finishes. Often released into products by the use of formaldehyde releasers such as imidazolidinyl urea, diazolidinyl urea, Quaternium-15, DMDM Hydantoin, and 2-bromo-2-nitropropane-1,3-diol.
- Fragrance mix – group of the eight most common fragrance allergens found in foods, cosmetic products, insecticides, antiseptics, soaps, perfumes, and dental products Limonene and Linalool are also commonly implicated in allergic contact dermatitis responsible for over 10% of all cases of Allergic contact dermatitis
- Gold (gold sodium thiosulfate) – precious metal and compound often found in jewelry and dental materials
- Isothiazolinones – preservatives used in many personal care, household, and commercial products.
- Mercaptobenzothiazole – in rubber products, notably shoes, gloves, and car tires.
- Neomycin – topical antibiotic common in first aid creams and ointments, cosmetics, deodorant, soap, and pet food. Found by itself, or in Neosporin or Triple Antibiotic
- Nickel (nickel sulfate hexahydrate) – has been recognized as a significant cause of allergy. This metal is frequently encountered in stainless steel cookware, jewelry and clasps or buttons on clothing. Current estimates gauge are that roughly 2.5 million US adults and 250,000 children suffer from nickel allergy, which costs an estimated $5.7 billion per year for treatment of symptoms. A significant portion of nickel allergy is preventable.
- p-Phenylenediamine (PPD) – although it's mainly used as a component of engineering polymers and composites like kevlar, it is also an ingredient in hair dyes, which, once sensitized to, becomes lifelong. One can develop active sensitization to products, including but not limited to black clothing, various inks, hair dye, dyed fur, dyed leather, and certain photographic products.
- Photographic developers, especially those containing metol
- Quaternium-15 – preservative in cosmetic products (self-tanners, shampoo, nail polish, sunscreen) and in industrial products (polishes, paints, and waxes).
- Sap from certain species of mangrove and agave
- Soluble salts of platinum – see platinosis
- Thiomersal – mercury compound used in local antiseptics and in vaccines
- Topical anesthetics – such as pramoxine or diphenhydramine, after prolonged use
- Topical steroid – see steroid allergy
- Urushiol – oily coating from plants of Toxicodendron genus – poison ivy, poison oak, and poison sumac. Also found in mango plants, mango skin, cashews, and smoke from burning urushiol-containing plants, which can cause skin as well as severe lung irritation.

== Mechanism ==
Allergic contact dermatitis (ACD) arises as a result of two essential stages: an induction phase, which primes and sensitizes the immune system for an allergic response, and an elicitation phase, in which this response is triggered. During the induction phase, exposure to the allergic substance (allergen) leads to its processing and presentation by immune cells, priming the immune system for a response. In the elicitation phase, subsequent contact with the same allergen, T cells directly recognize the allergen, resulting in an immune response at the contact site. The allergic reaction, being mediated directly by T-cells, is classified as a Type IV hypersensitivity reaction. This classification differs from the more prevalent Type I hypersensitivity (e.g., hay fever), where allergens bind to IgE antibodies, which subsequently trigger mast cells.

In contact allergies, the molecules responsible (allergens) are typically small and cannot be directly recognized by the immune system. These allergens can trigger a reaction only after they undergo a process called haptenization. During haptenization, the allergens bind to larger molecules (carrier proteins) naturally present in the skin. This complex of allergen and carrier protein is what the immune system detects as foreign, leading to an allergic response.

The conjugate formed is then recognized as a foreign body by the Langerhans cells (LCs) (and in some cases other Dendritic cells (DCs)), which then internalize the protein; transport it via the lymphatic system to the regional lymph nodes; and present the antigen to T-lymphocytes. This process is controlled by cytokines and chemokines – with tumor necrosis factor alpha (TNF-α) and certain members of the interleukin family (1, 13 and 18) – and their action serves either to promote or to inhibit the mobilization and migration of these LCs. As the LCs are transported to the lymph nodes, they become differentiated and transform into DCs, which are immunostimulatory in nature.

Once within the lymph glands, the differentiated DCs present the allergenic epitope associated with the allergen to T lymphocytes. These T cells then divide and differentiate, clonally multiplying so that if the allergen is experienced again by the individual, these T cells will respond more quickly and more aggressively.

White et al. have suggested that there appears to be a threshold to the mechanisms of allergic sensitization by ACD-associated allergens (1986). This is thought to be linked to the level at which the toxin induces the up-regulation of the required mandatory cytokines and chemokines. It has also been proposed that the vehicle in which the allergen reaches the skin could take some responsibility in the sensitization of the epidermis by both assisting the percutaneous penetration and causing some form of trauma and mobilization of cytokines itself.

=== Memory response ===
Once an individual is sensitized to an allergen, future contacts with the allergen can trigger a reaction, commonly known as a memory response, in the original site of sensitization. So, for example, if a person has an allergic contact dermatitis on the eyelids, say from use of makeup, touching the contact allergen with the fingers can trigger an allergic reaction on the eyelids.

This is due to local skin memory T-cells, which remain in the original sensitization site. In a similar fashion, cytotoxic T lymphocytes patrol an area of skin and play an important role in controlling both the reactivation of viruses (such as the "cold sore" virus) and in limiting its replication when reactivated. Memory response, or "Retest Reactivity", usually takes 2 to 3 days after coming in contact with the allergen, and can persist for 2 to 4 weeks.

== Diagnosis ==
Diagnosing allergic contact dermatitis is primarily based on physical exam and medical history. In some cases, doctors can establish an accurate diagnosis based on the symptoms that the patient experiences and on the rash's appearance. In the case of a single episode of allergic contact dermatitis, this is all that is necessary. Chronic and/or intermittent rashes that are not readily explained by history and physical exam often will benefit from further testing.

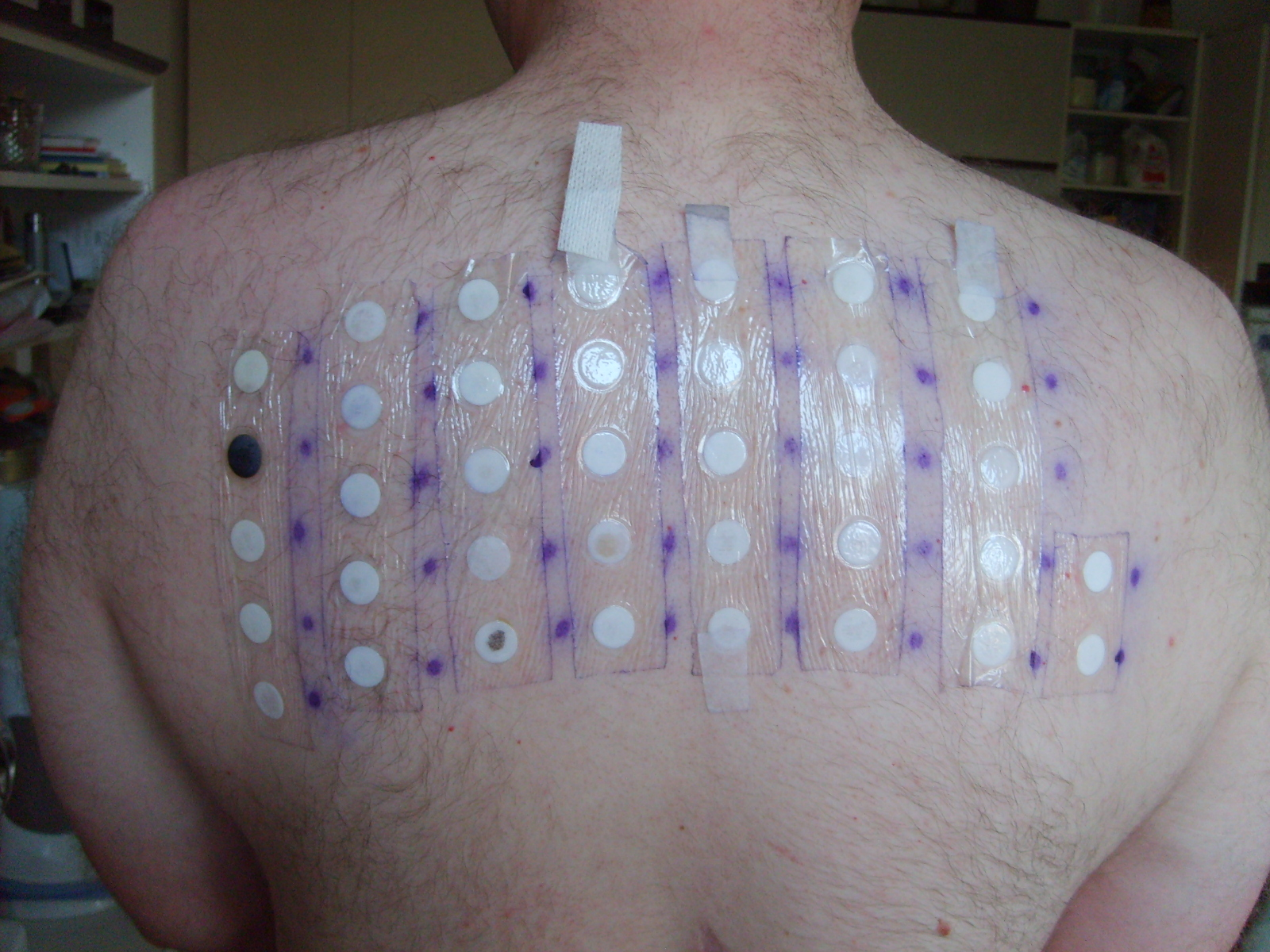
Patch test

A patch test (contact delayed hypersensitivity allergy test) is a commonly used examination to determine the exact cause of an allergic contact dermatitis. According to the American Academy of Allergy, Asthma, and Immunology, "patch testing is the gold standard for contact allergen identification".

The patch test consists of applying small quantities of potential allergens to small patches, which are then placed on the skin. After two days, they are removed, and if a skin reaction occurred to one of the substances applied, a raised bump will be noticeable underneath the patch. The tests are again read at 72 or 96 hours after application.

Patch testing is used for patients who have chronic, recurring contact dermatitis. Other tests that may be used to diagnose contact dermatitis and rule out other potential causes of the symptoms include a skin biopsy and culture of the skin lesion.

== Treatment ==
The clinical expression of the dermatitis can be mitigated by avoidance of the allergen. Through compliance with avoidance measures, the immune system can become less stimulated. The key to avoidance is proper evaluation and detection of the inciting allergen. However, once the immune system registers the allergen, the recognition is usually permanent.

The first step in treating the condition is appropriate recognition of the clinical problem, followed by identification of the culprit chemical and the source of that chemical. Corticosteroid creams should be used carefully and according to the prescribed directions because, when overused over longer periods of time, they can cause thinning of the skin. Also, in some instances, such as poison ivy dermatitis, calamine lotion and cool oatmeal baths may relieve itching.

Unlike the more common Type I allergies (e.g., hay fever), contact allergies are not mediated by histamine, making the use of normal allergy medication (antihistamine) medication ineffective, and other drugs have to be used to treat the allergic reaction.

Usually, severe cases are treated with systemic corticosteroids, which may be tapered gradually, with various dosing schedules ranging from a total of 12 – 20 days to prevent the recurrence of the rash (while the chemical allergen is still in the skin, up to 3 weeks, as well as a topical corticosteroid. Tacrolimus ointment or pimecrolimus cream can also be used additionally to the corticosteroid creams or instead of these. Oral antihistamines such as diphenhydramine or hydroxyzine may also be used in more severe cases to relieve the intense itching via sedation. Topical antihistamines are not advised as there might be a second skin reaction (treatment associated contact dermatitis) from the lotion itself.

The other symptoms caused by allergic contact dermatitis may be eased with cool compresses to stop the itching. It is vital for treatment success that the trigger be identified and avoided. If the allergen is not avoided, the condition may even become chronic. The discomfort caused by the symptoms may be relieved by wearing smooth-textured cotton clothing to avoid frictional skin irritation or by avoiding soaps with perfumes and dyes. Commonly, the symptoms may resolve without treatment in 2 to 4 weeks, but specific medication may hasten the healing as long as the trigger is avoided.

Identification of the allergen can be aided by the site of the dermatitis. Allergic dermatitis of the hands is often due to contact with preservatives, fragrances, metals, rubber, or topical antibiotics. Dermatitis at the front of the face is often due to gold (from jewelry and foundation), make-up, moisturizers, wrinkle creams, and topical medication. Along the eyelids as well as the sides of the head and neck, dermatitis is often caused by shampoo and conditioner dripping down from the hair. Inflammation on one side of the face often suggests transfer of an allergen from the hands or from the face of a partner.

== Epidemiology ==
Allergic contact dermatitis is common, affecting up to 20% of all people. People sensitive to one allergen are at an increased risk of being sensitive to others. Family members of those with allergic contact dermatitis are at higher risk of developing it themselves. Women are at higher risk of developing allergic contact dermatitis than men.

== See also ==
- Irritant contact dermatitis
- Patch test
- Codex Labs
- Occupational skin disease
