= Beryllium granuloma =

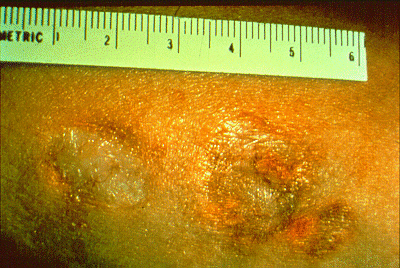
- Granulomas represent a focal chronic inflammatory reaction. These granulomas were produced by beryllium and are considered to be on a allergic basis.
- Specialty: Dermatology

Beryllium granulomas is a skin condition caused by granulomatous inflammation of the skin which may follow accident laceration, usually in the occupational setting.

== Beryllium and pneumoconiosis ==
Pneumoconiosis refers to a number restrictive lung diseases resulting from inhalation of dust and other occupational exposures, leading to inflammation, coughing and fibrosis. Berylliosis is associated with exposure to beryllium in the beryllium mining, aerospace and manufacturing industries. Chronic exposure to beryllium can be histologically characterised by non-caseating granulomas—structures formed in certain infectious and toxin-mediated diseases in which tissue resident macrophages build a wall around the threat, thus nullifying it. Because of this, beryllium associated granulomas are occasionally responsive to steroids and other immunosuppressants [cite].

Beryllium granulomas usually occur in the upper lobes of the lung, hilar lymph nodes and sometimes spreads systemically to distant organs. Exposure to beryllium is associated with an increased risk for cancer [cite].

== See also ==
- Granuloma
- List of cutaneous conditions
