= Xeroderma =

Excessively dry skin

Xerosis
- Other names: Xerodermia, xerosis cutis, dry skin
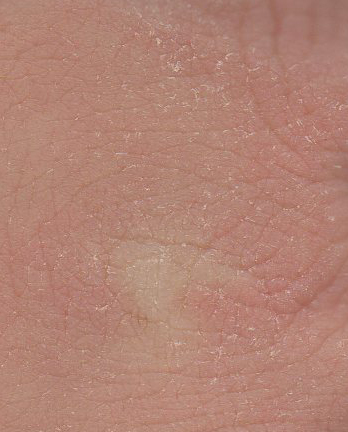
- The surface of the knuckles of a hand with xeroderma
- Specialty: Dermatology
- Symptoms: Low skin moisture, itching, scaling, skin cracking
- Causes: Deficiency of certain vitamins and minerals, exposure to detergents, sunburn, choline inhibitors
- Risk factors: Low relative humidity of surrounding air, frequent bathing or hand washing
- Prevention: Skin lotions
- Medication: Emollients

Xeroderma is a skin condition characterized by excessively dry skin. The synonyms xerosis and xerosis cutis are sometimes used in a medical context. Colloquially, xeroderma may be referred to as dry skin or as ashiness or ashy skin when present in dark skin. Xeroderma derives from Greek ξηρός (xeros) 'dry' and δέρμα (derma) 'skin'.

In most cases, xeroderma can safely be treated with moisturizers (also called emollients). Xeroderma occurs most commonly on the scalp, lower legs, arms, hands, knuckles, the sides of the abdomen, and thighs. Symptoms most associated with xeroderma are such skin conditions as scaling (the visible peeling of the outer skin layer), itching, and skin fissures (cracked skin).

== Causes ==
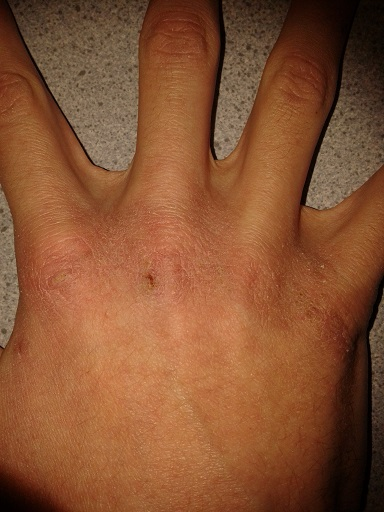
Effects of xeroderma on the hand

Xeroderma is a very common condition. It happens more often in the winter when the cold air outside and the hot air inside create a low relative humidity. This causes the skin to lose moisture and it may crack and peel. Bathing or hand washing too frequently, especially if one is using harsh soaps, can contribute to xeroderma. Xeroderma can be caused by a deficiency of vitamin A, vitamin D, zinc, systemic illness, severe sunburn, or some medication. Xeroderma can be caused by choline inhibitors. Detergents such as washing powder and dishwashing liquid can cause xeroderma.

== Prevention ==
Today, many creams and lotions, commonly based on vegetable oils/butters, petroleum oils/jellies, and lanolin are widely available. As a preventive measure, such products may be rubbed onto the affected area as needed (often every other day) to prevent xeroderma. The skin is then patted dry to prevent the removal of natural lipids from the skin. Taking a shower or washing hands with special moisturizing soaps or body washes can protect the skin from drying out further.

== Treatment ==
Repeated application (typically over a few days) of emollients or skin lotions/creams to the affected area will likely result in quick alleviation of xeroderma. In particular, the application of highly occlusive barriers to moisture, such as petrolatum, vegetable oils/butters, and mineral oil have been shown to provide excellent results. Many individuals find specific commercial skin creams and lotions (often comprising oils, butters, and or waxes emulsified in water) quite effective (although individual preferences and results vary among the wide array of commercially available creams).

Lanolin, a natural mixture of lipids derived from sheep's wool, helps replace natural lipids in human skin and has been used since ancient times (and in modern medicine) as among the most powerful treatments for xeroderma. Some people may, however, have allergies to lanolin, producing the opposite of the desired effect. Also, pure lanolin is a thick waxy substance which, for many individuals, proves difficult and inconvenient for general use on dry skin (especially over large areas of the body). As a result, many formulated lanolin products, having a softer consistency than pure lanolin, are available.

=== Safety ===
Many skin creams include common allergens such as fragrances, parabens, and lanolin.

== See also ==
- Eczema
- Ichthyosis
- Xeroderma pigmentosum
