= Occupational skin diseases =

Human skin diseases resulting from work activity

Occupational skin diseases are ranked among the top five occupational diseases in many countries.

Contact dermatitis due to irritation is inflammation of the skin which results from a contact with an irritant. It has been observed that this type of dermatitis does not require prior sensitization of the immune system. There have been studies to support that past or present atopic dermatitis is a risk factor for this type of dermatitis. Common irritants include detergents, acids, alkalis, oils, organic solvents and reducing agents.

Clinical manifestations of the contact dermatitis are also modified by external factors such as environmental factors (mechanical pressure, temperature, and humidity) and predisposing characteristics of the individual (age, sex, ethnic origin, preexisting skin disease, atopic skin diathesis, and anatomic region exposed.

Another occupational skin disease is glove-related hand urticaria, believed to be caused by repeated wearing and removal of the gloves. It has been reported as an occupational problem among healthcare workers. The reaction is caused by the latex or the nitrile present in the gloves.

== Types ==
The acute form of this dermatitis develops on exposure of the skin to a strong irritant or caustic chemical. This exposure can occur as a result of accident at a workplace. The irritant reaction increases in its intensity within minutes to hours of exposure and reaches its peak quickly. After the reaction has reached its peak level, it starts to heal. This process is known as decrescendo phenomenon. The most frequent potent irritants leading to this type of dermatitis are acids and alkaline solutions. The symptoms include redness and swelling of the skin along with the formation of blisters.

The chronic form occurs as a result of repeated exposure of the skin to weak irritants over long periods of time.

== Prevention ==
Prevention measures include avoidance of the irritant through its removal from the workplace or through technical shielding by the use of potent irritants in closed systems or automation, irritant replacement or removal and personal protection of workers. Low quality evidence exists for the effectiveness of certain therapies and their ability to specifically prevent hand skin irritation in the workplace. The limited evidence that does exist suggests that moisturizers used alone or in combination with a barrier cream can result in a clinically beneficial effect in the long or short-term primary prevention of occupational irritant hand dermatitis.
