= Irritant contact dermatitis =

Inflammation of the skin due to contact with an irritant

- Specialty: Dermatology

Irritant contact dermatitis is a form of contact dermatitis that can be divided into forms caused by chemical irritants and those caused by physical irritants.

== Chemical ==
Chemical irritant contact dermatitis is either acute or chronic, which is usually associated with strong and weak irritants respectively. The following definition is provided by Mathias and Maibach (1978): The mechanism of action varies. Detergents, surfactants, extremes of pH, and organic solvents all directly affect the barrier properties of the epidermis. These effects include removing fat emulsion, defatting of dermal lipids, inflicting cellular damage on the epithelium, and increasing the transepidermal water loss by damaging the horny layer water-binding mechanisms and damaging the DNA, which causes the layer to thin. Concentrated irritants have an acute effect, but this is not as common as the accumulative, chronic effect of irritants whose deleterious effects build up with subsequent doses (ESCD 2006).

Chemical irritants are often strong alkalis as found in drain cleaners and soap with lye residues. Many other chemical compounds can also cause contact dermatitis.

== Physical ==
Physical irritant contact dermatitis is a less-researched form of irritant contact dermatitis due to its various mechanisms of action and a lack of a test for its diagnosis.

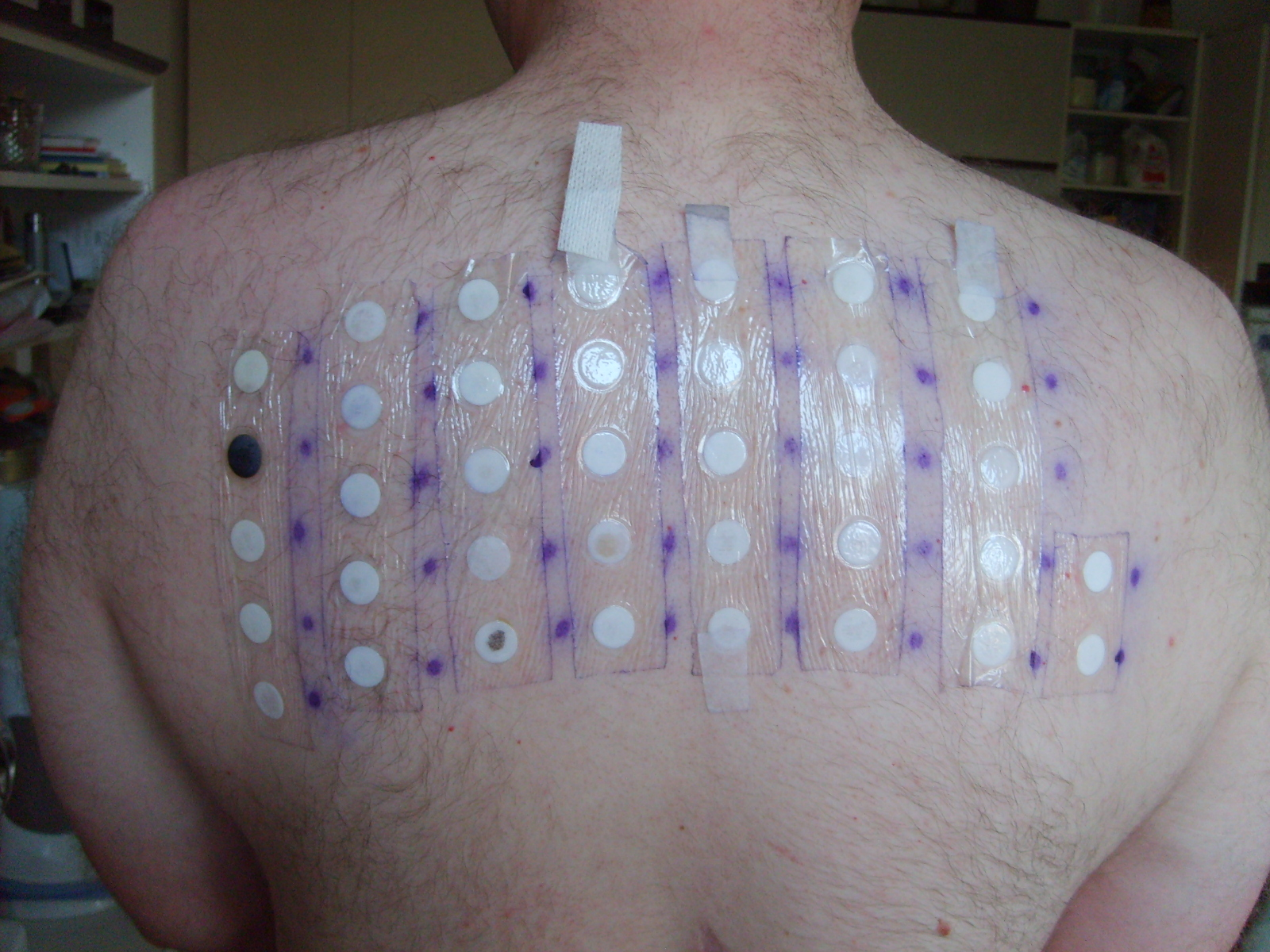
Patch test

A complete patient history combined with negative allergic patch testing is usually necessary to reach a correct diagnosis. The simplest form of physical irritant contact dermatitis results from prolonged rubbing, although the diversity of implicated irritants is far wider. Examples include paper friction, fiberglass, and scratchy clothing.

=== Low humidity ===
Low humidity from air conditioning was found to be the most common cause of physical irritant contact dermatitis.

=== Plants ===
Many plants cause irritant contact dermatitis through their spines or irritant hairs. Some plants such as the buttercup, spurge, and daisy act by chemical means. The sap of these plants contains a number of alkaloids, glycosides, saponins, anthraquinones, and (in the case of plant bulbs) irritant calcium oxalate crystals – all of which can cause crystal irritant contact dermatitis.

Butternut squash and acorn squash have been known to cause an allergic reaction in many individuals, especially in food preparation where the squash skin is cut and exposed to the epidermis. Food handlers and kitchen workers often take precautions to wear rubber or latex gloves when peeling butternut and acorn squash to avoid temporary butternut squash (Cucurbita moschata) dermatitis A contact dermatitis reaction to butternut or acorn squash may result in orange and cracked skin, a sensation of "tightness", "roughness" or "rawness".

=== Arthropods ===
Some species of insects and spiders possess urticating hairs, including the caterpillars of the hickory tussock moth, the saddleback moth, the buck moth, and most species of tarantula from North and South America. These hairs produce irritant contact dermatitis in a similar way to the way that plant hairs do.
