= Skin fissure =

Cutaneous condition

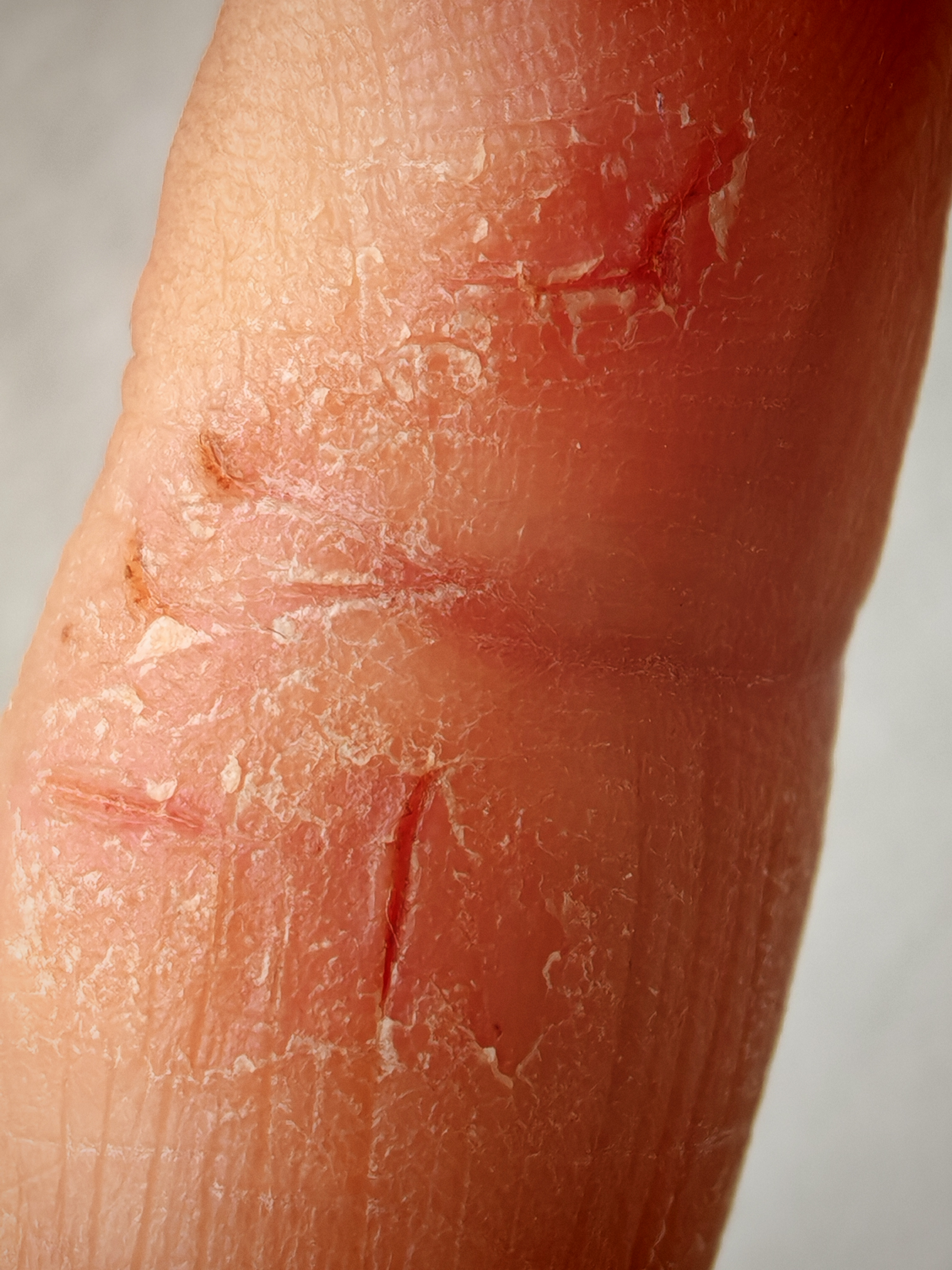
Eczematous fissures on skin of inner surface of finger

Schematic image comparing a skin fissure to an erosion and an ulcer.

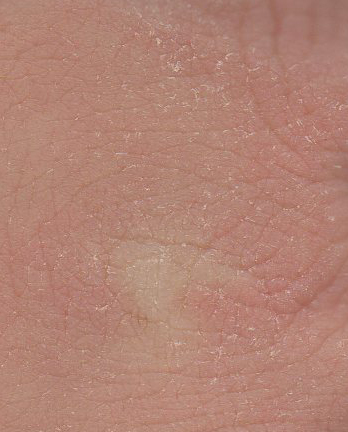
The surface of the knuckles of a hand with xeroderma, showing skin cracking (generalized skin fissuring)

A skin fissure is a cutaneous condition in which there is a linear cleavage of skin, sometimes defined as extending into the dermis. It is smaller than a skin laceration.

== Generalized ==
A skin area on which there are many skin fissures is called cracked skin, and is most commonly a result of skin dryness, cold weather, chemical irritants (such as laundry detergent or hand soap), certain types of skin-cream medication or excess moisture. Additionally, ichthyosis is a genetic disorder where there is often severe skin cracking. Skin fissure occur on areas exposed to frequent movement or environmental stress, such as the hands, feet, fingers and heels.
