= Ulobetasol =

Chemical compound

Clinical data
- Trade names: Ultravate
- Other names: (6S,8S,9S,10S,11S,13S,14S,16S,17R)-17-(2-Chloroacetyl)-6,9-difluoro-11,17-dihydroxy-10,13,16-trimethyl-6,7,8,11,12,14,15,16-octahydrocyclopenta[a]phenanthren-3-one, halobetasol (USAN US)
- AHFS/Drugs.com: Professional Drug Facts
- MedlinePlus: a601060
- ATC code: D07AC21 (WHO) D05AX55 (WHO) (combination with tazarotene)

Identifiers
- IUPAC name: (6α,11β,16β)-21-Chloro-6,9-difluoro-11,17-dihydroxy-16-methylpregna-1,4-diene-3,20-dione
- CAS Number: 98651-66-2
- PubChem CID: 5311167
- ChemSpider: 4470691
- UNII: 9P6159HM7T
- KEGG: D08660
- ChEMBL: ChEMBL1201360
- CompTox Dashboard (EPA): DTXSID60243759

Chemical and physical data
- Formula: C_{22}H_{27}ClF_{2}O_{4}
- Molar mass: 428.90 g·mol^{−1}
- 3D model (JSmol): Interactive image
- SMILES: ClCC(=O)[C@]3(O)[C@]2(C[C@H](O)[C@]4(F)[C@@]/1(\C(=C/C(=O)\C=C\1)[C@@H](F)C[C@H]4[C@@H]2C[C@@H]3C)C)C
- InChI: InChI=1S/C22H27ClF2O4/c1-11-6-13-14-8-16(24)15-7-12(26)4-5-19(15,2)21(14,25)17(27)9-20(13,3)22(11,29)18(28)10-23/h4-5,7,11,13-14,16-17,27,29H,6,8-10H2,1-3H3/t11-,13-,14-,16-,17-,19-,20-,21-,22-/m0/s1; Key:LEHFPXVYPMWYQD-XHIJKXOTSA-N

Ulobetasol (INN) or halobetasol (USAN) is a corticosteroid used to treat psoriasis. It is a class I corticosteroid under the US classification and a group III corticosteroid under international classification, the most potent group of such drugs.

Ulobetasol propionate is usually supplied as a 0.05% topical cream. Ulobetasol is the strongest topical steroid available. It is also sold with tazarotene with 0.01% halobetasol and 0.045% tazarotene as a lotion branded as Duobrii (Bausch Health).

It is available as a generic medication.
