= Diffuse idiopathic skeletal hyperostosis =

- Other names: Forestier's disease, senile ankylosing spondylosis, ankylosing hyperostosis
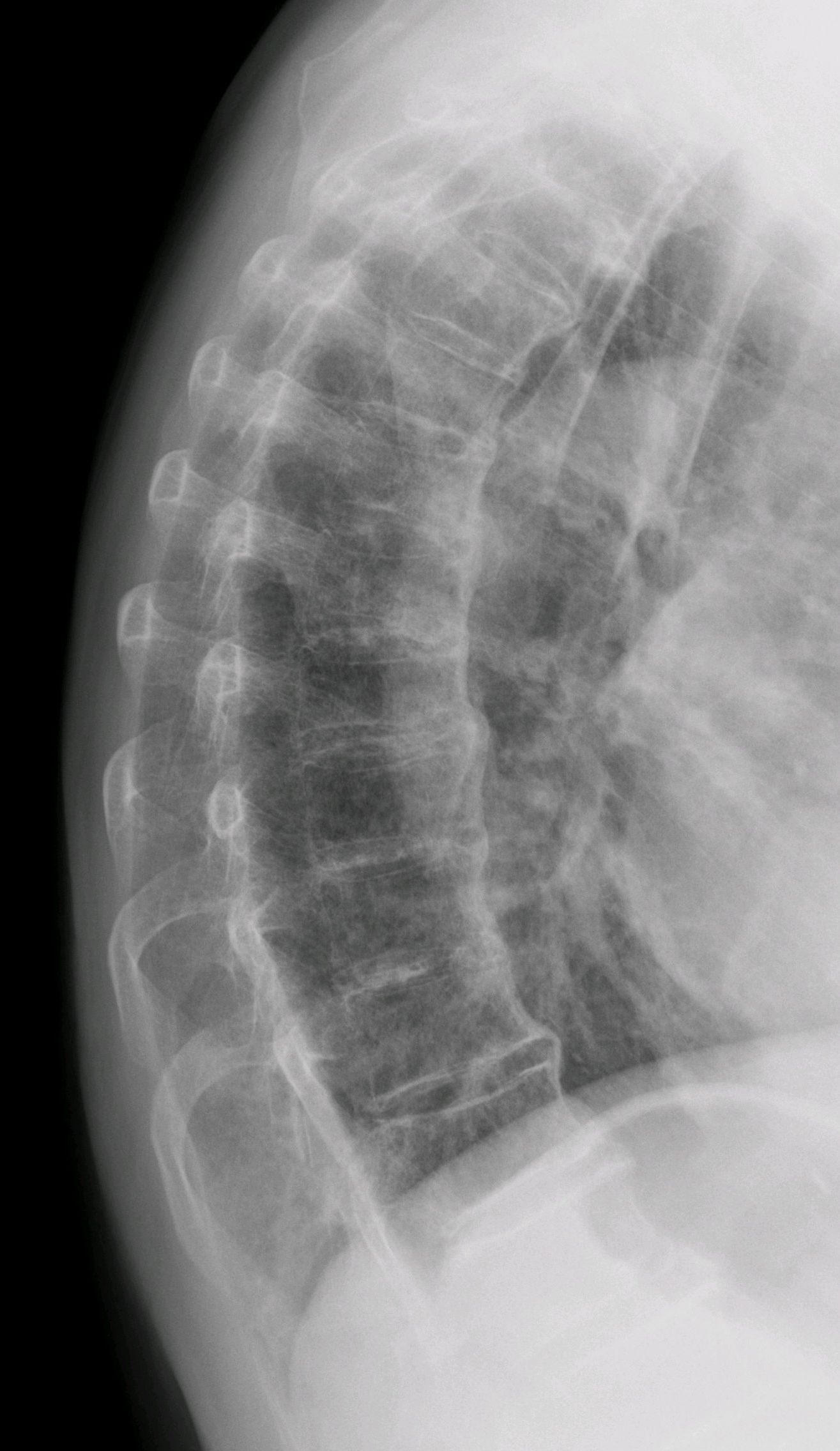
- DISH in an 80 year old female, also with T11 fracture.
- Specialty: Rheumatology

Diffuse idiopathic skeletal hyperostosis (DISH) is a condition characterized by abnormal calcification/bone formation (hyperostosis) of the soft tissues surrounding the joints of the spine, and also of the peripheral or appendicular skeleton. In the spine, there is bone formation along the anterior longitudinal ligament and sometimes the posterior longitudinal ligament, which may lead to partial or complete fusion of adjacent vertebrae. The facet and sacroiliac joints tend to be uninvolved. The thoracic spine is the most common level involved. In the peripheral skeleton, DISH manifests as a calcific enthesopathy, with pathologic bone formation at sites where ligaments and tendons attach to bone.

== Signs and symptoms ==
Symptoms may include pain, stiffness, and restricted movements of the affected areas. The majority of people with DISH are not symptomatic, and the findings are an incidental imaging abnormality.

In some, the x-ray findings may correspond to symptoms of back stiffness with flexion/extension or with mild back pain. Back pain or stiffness may be worse in the morning. Rarely, large anterior cervical spine osteophytes may affect the esophagus or the larynx and cause pain, difficulty swallowing or even dyspnea. Similar calcification and ossification may be seen at peripheral entheseal sites, including the shoulder, iliac crest, ischial tuberosity, trochanters of the hip, tibial tuberosities, patellae, and bones of the hands and/or feet.

DISH can be a complicating factor when suffering from trauma involving the spine. It increases the risk of unstable fractures involving the intervertebral disc and the calcified/ossified ligaments which influences the need for surgical treatment.

== Cause ==
DISH most commonly affects the elderly, especially 6th to 7th decades. The estimated frequency in the elderly is ~10% – 20%, with a slight male predominance.

The exact cause is unknown. Mechanical, dietary factors and use of some medications (e.g. isotretinoin, etretinate, acitretin and other vitamin A derivatives) may be of significance. There is a correlation between these factors but not a cause or effect. The distinctive radiological feature of DISH is the continuous linear calcification along the antero-medial aspect of the thoracic spine. DISH is usually found in people in their 60s and above, and is extremely rare in people in their 30s and 40s. The disease can spread to any joint of the body, affecting the neck, shoulders, ribs, hips, pelvis, knees, ankles, and hands. The disease is not fatal; however, some associated complications can lead to death. Complications may include paralysis, dysphagia (difficulty swallowing), and lung infections.

Although DISH manifests in a similar manner to ankylosing spondylitis, they are separate diseases. Ankylosing spondylitis is a genetic disease with identifiable marks, tends to start showing signs in adolescence or young adulthood, is more likely to affect the lumbar spine, and affects organs. DISH has no indication of a genetic link, is primarily thoracic and does not affect organs other than the lungs, and only indirectly due to the fusion of the rib cage.

Long-term treatment of acne with vitamin derived retinoids, such as etretinate and acitretin, have been associated with extraspinal hyperostosis.

== Diagnosis ==
DISH is diagnosed by findings on x-ray studies. Radiographs of the spine will show abnormal bone formation (ossification) along the anterior spinal ligament. The disc spaces, facet and sacroiliac joints remain unaffected. Diagnosis requires confluent ossification of at least four contiguous vertebral bodies. Classically, advanced disease may have "melted candle wax" appearance along the spine on radiographic studies. In some cases, DISH may be manifested as ossification, or enthesis, in other parts of the skeleton.

The calcification and ossification is most common on the right side of the spine. In people with dextrocardia and situs inversus this calcification occurs on the left side.

Examples of DISH

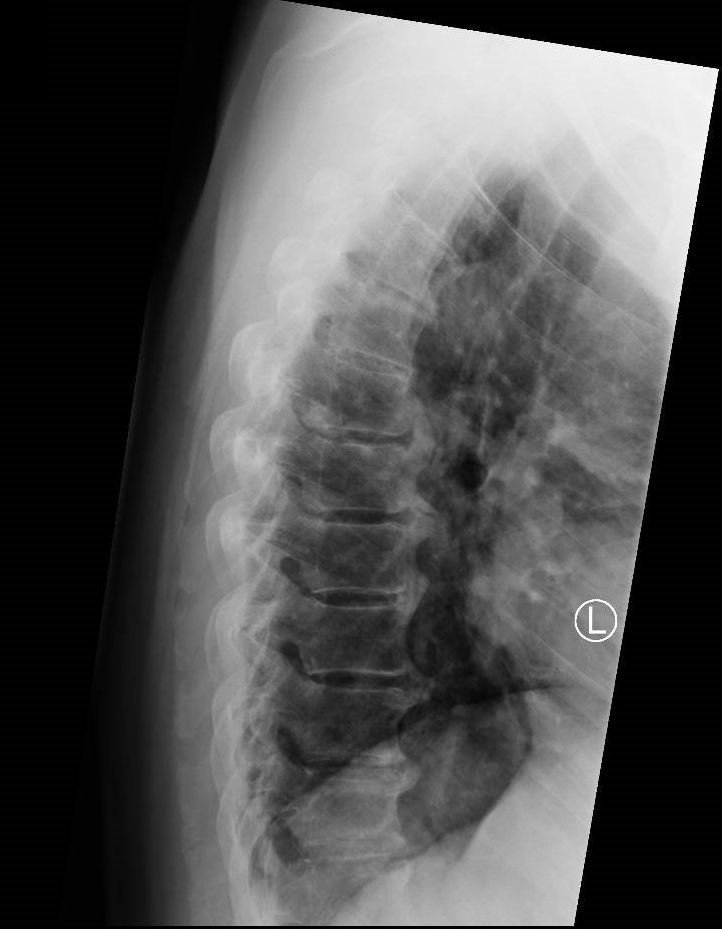
Confluent ossification of multiple contiguous vertebral bodies in diffuse idiopathic skeletal hyperostosis (DISH)

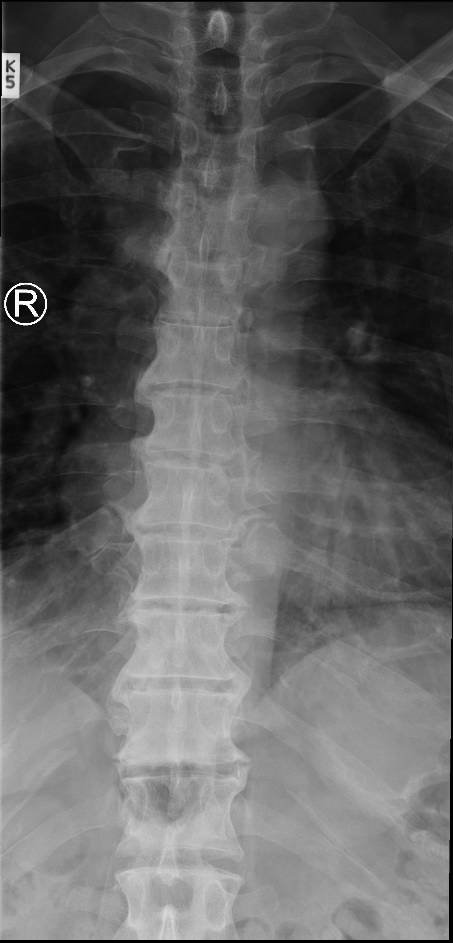
"Melted candle wax" appearance of calcification and ossification in diffuse idiopathic skeletal hyperostosis (DISH). Note the preponderance on the patient's right side (left side of image).

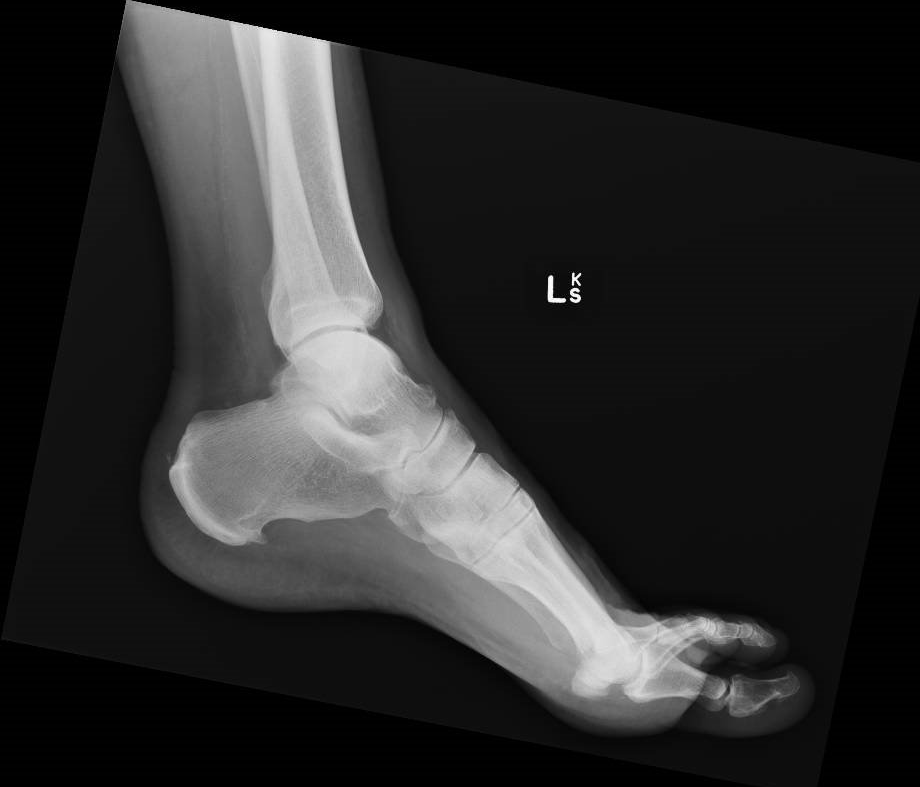
Ectopic calcification at Achilles tendon insertion and new bone formation in calcaneal spur in diffuse idiopathic skeletal hyperostosis (DISH)

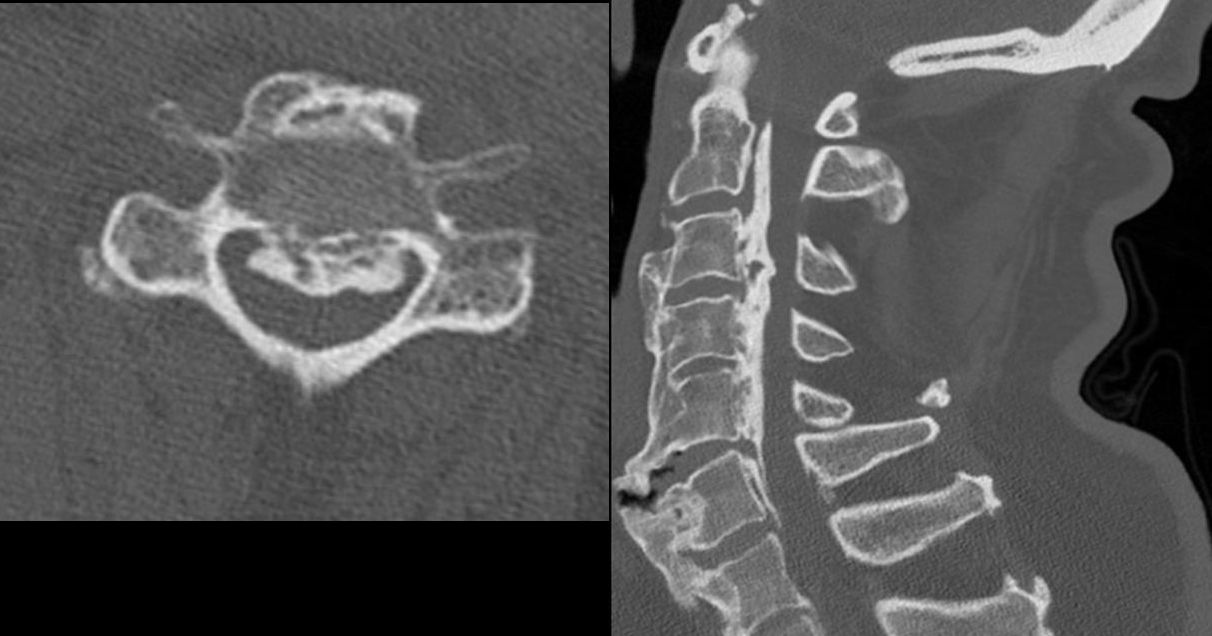
Ossification of the posterior longitudinal ligament in DISH

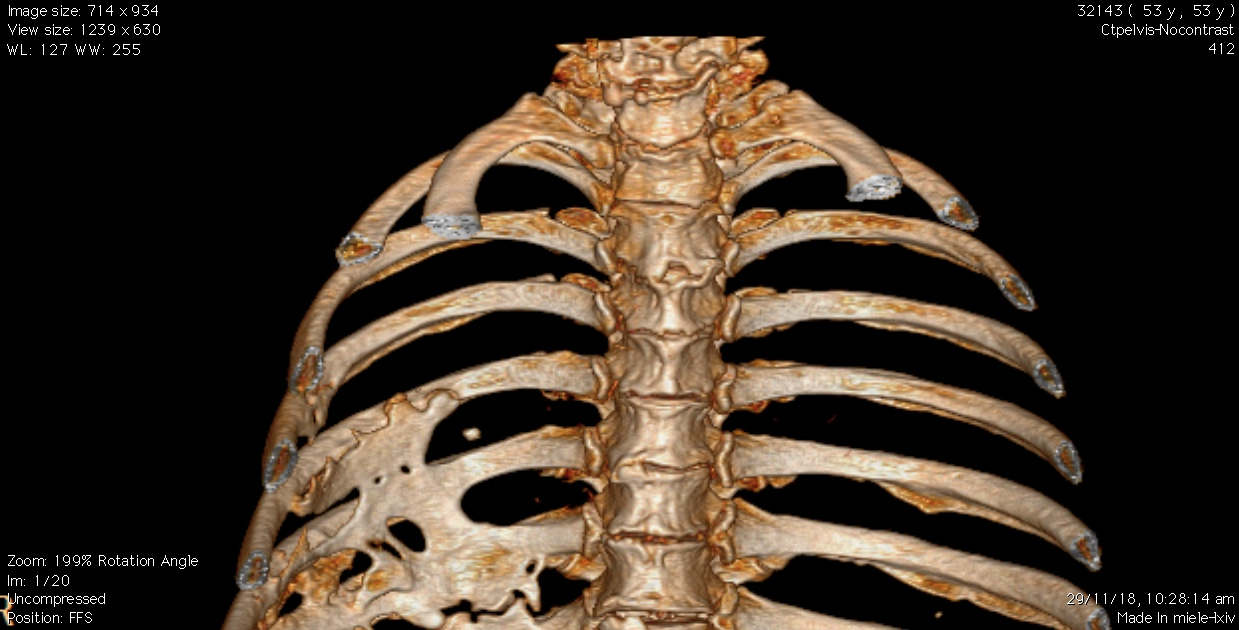

== Treatment ==
There is limited scientific evidence for the treatment for symptomatic DISH.

Symptoms of pain and stiffness may be treated with conservative measures, analgesic medications (such as non-steroidal anti-inflammatory drugs), and physical therapy.

In extraordinary cases where calcification or osteophyte formation is causing severe and focal symptoms, such as difficulty swallowing or nerve impingement, surgical intervention may be pursued.

== In archaeology ==
As DISH manifests in the skeleton and is not immediately fatal, it is a pathology that can be visible archaeologically. Due to its associations with a fat and protein-heavy diet and little exercise, it may be indicative of a relatively high-status individual who could enjoy rich foods without much physical labour. In Britain, the condition is first suggested to appear in prehistory, but it is most common in medieval contexts, where it is particularly associated with monastic burials.

== See also ==
- Ankylosing spondylitis
- Enthesitis
- Osteoarthritis
- Retinoids
