= Halobetasol/tazarotene =

Combination medication

Combination of
- Ulobetasol propionate: Corticosteroid
- Tazarotene: Retinoid

Clinical data
- Trade names: Duobrii
- AHFS/Drugs.com: Multum Consumer Information
- Routes of administration: Topical

Legal status
- Legal status: CA: ℞-only; US: ℞-only

Halobetasol/tazarotene (Duobrii) is a topical combination drug used to treat plaque psoriasis. It combines 0.01% halobetasol propionate (a corticosteroid that reduces inflammation and suppresses the immune system) and 0.045% tazarotene (a retinoid that promotes normal skin cell turnover and has anti-inflammatory effects) in a lotion formulation. It was approved as a prescription drug by the U.S. Food and Drug Administration (FDA) in April 2019 and by Health Canada in June 2020.
