= ATC code D05 =

ATC code D05 Antipsoriatics is a therapeutic subgroup of the Anatomical Therapeutic Chemical Classification System, a system of alphanumeric codes developed by the World Health Organization (WHO) for the classification of drugs and other medical products. Subgroup D05 is part of the anatomical group D Dermatologicals.

Codes for veterinary use (ATCvet codes) can be created by placing the letter Q in front of the human ATC code: for example, QD05.
National versions of the ATC classification may include additional codes not present in this list, which follows the WHO version.
In ATCvet, this subgroup is named "QD05 Drugs for keratoseborrheic disorders".

== D05A Antipsoriatics for topical use ==
In ATCvet, this subgroup is named "QD05A Drugs for keratoseborrheic disorders, topical use".

=== D05AC Antracen derivatives ===
D05AC01 Dithranol
D05AC51 Dithranol, combinations

=== D05AD Psoralens for topical use ===
D05AD01 Trioxysalen
D05AD02 Methoxsalen

=== D05AX Other antipsoriatics for topical use ===
In ATCvet, this subgroup is named "QD05AX Other drugs for keratoseborrheic disorders for topical use".

D05AX01 Fumaric acid
D05AX02 Calcipotriol
D05AX03 Calcitriol
D05AX04 Tacalcitol
D05AX05 Tazarotene
D05AX06 Roflumilast
D05AX07 Tapinarof
D05AX52 Calcipotriol, combinations
D05AX55 Tazarotene and ulobetasol

== D05B Antipsoriatics for systemic use ==
In ATCvet, this subgroup is named "QD05B Drugs for keratoseborrheic disorders, systemic use".

=== D05BA Psoralens for systemic use ===
D05BA01 Trioxysalen
D05BA02 Methoxsalen
D05BA03 Bergapten

=== D05BB Retinoids for treatment of psoriasis ===
D05BB01 Etretinate
D05BB02 Acitretin

=== D05BX Other antipsoriatics for systemic use ===
In ATCvet, this subgroup is named "QD05BX Other drugs for keratoseborrheic disorders for systemic use".

D05BX51 Fumaric acid derivatives, combinations
