= Staining of the nail plate =

- Staining of the nail plate due to nicotine
- Specialty: Dermatology

Staining of the nail plate may occur due to nicotine, dyes (including hair dyes and nail polish), potassium permanganate, mercury compounds, hydroquinone, elemental iron, mepacrine, photographic developer, anthralin, chrysarobin, glutaraldehyde, or resorcin.

== See also ==
- Nail anatomy
- List of cutaneous conditions
