= KCL-286 =

Chemical compound

Identifiers
- IUPAC name: 4-[5-(4,7-dimethyl-1-benzofuran-2-yl)-1,2,4-oxadiazol-3-yl]benzoic acid
- CAS Number: 1952276-71-9
- PubChem CID: 121414283
- ChemSpider: 88295952
- UNII: N8LRS5GBB6

Chemical and physical data
- Formula: C_{19}H_{14}N_{2}O_{4}
- Molar mass: 334.331 g·mol^{−1}
- 3D model (JSmol): Interactive image
- SMILES: CC1=C2C=C(OC2=C(C=C1)C)C3=NC(=NO3)C4=CC=C(C=C4)C(=O)O
- InChI: InChI=1S/C19H14N2O4/c1-10-3-4-11(2)16-14(10)9-15(24-16)18-20-17(21-25-18)12-5-7-13(8-6-12)19(22)23/h3-9H,1-2H3,(H,22,23); Key:AVCXUODHLRZJJP-UHFFFAOYSA-N

KCL-286 (C286), is a potent, orally bioavailable retinoic acid receptor beta (RARβ) agonist (EC50 = 1.9nM) with good selectivity over the RARα, and RARγ receptors. This molecule increases neurite outgrowth in vitro and stimulates sensory axon regrowth in vivo in a rodent model of crush and avulsion injury, and is being evaluated for the treatment of nerve injury. It has antiinflammatory and neuroregeneration-promoting effects in humans and is now in clinical trials for the treatment of Alzheimer's disease and spinal cord injury following positive results in animal studies.

== Discovery and design ==
Replacing the amide linkage in the novel selective RARα agonist 1 with a series of 5-membered heterocyclic rings, gave heterocyclic compounds that were selective as RARβ agonists. The best was the highly potent RARβ agonist oxadiazole 2, that had 12- and 19-fold selectivity as an agonist over RARα and RARγ respectively. Lead optimisation produced the highly potent and selective RARβ agonist 4-(5-(4,7-dimethylbenzofuran-2-yl)-1,2,4-oxadiazol-3-yl) benzoic acid C286.

Discovery and Design of C286

== Mechanism of action ==
It has been shown that RARβ signalling is needed in order for retinoid mediated neurite outgrowth of neurons to occur. In contrast, signalling by RARα, RARγ or the retinoid X receptor (RXR) has no effect on this action. The RARβ agonist C286 can activate the RARβ receptor which initiates axonal outgrowth in models of nerve injury and leads to functional recovery.

== Pharmacology ==
C286 has been demonstrated to increase neurite outgrowth in vitro in monolayers of cultured cerebellar neurons where it increased neurite length in a dose dependant manner. C286 orally induces sensory axon regrowth in vivo in a rodent model of crush and avulsion injury. In addition C286 has shown a novel function for RARβ in remyelination after peripheral nervous system / central nervous system injury, and also demonstrates efficacy in a pre-clinical neuropathic pain model restoring multiple pathways via DNA repair mechanisms.

== Pharmacokinetics ==
C286 has mouse and human plasma protein binding of 95% and 98% respectively and has beneficial physico-chemical properties. It is reasonably water-soluble (> 100 μM as the sodium salt) and has sound permeability. Bi-directional permeability tests gave efflux ratios close to unity indicating that C286 is likely not a P-glycoprotein substrate. It has no significant inhibition IC50 > 25 μM against five cytochrome P450 enzymes (1A2, 2C9, 2C19, 2D6, 3A4), and shows very high stability in human microsomes, It was found to possess a good oral bioavailability in both rat (80%) and dog (45%). with a low rate of blood clearance and a moderate half-life in both species. It was also demonstrated to be able to penetrate the CNS, with nearly equivalent amounts detected in plasma as compared to brain tissue, eight hours after administering an oral dose to rats. C286 was also shown to be negative in the cytotoxicity and genotoxicity in-vitro screens.

== Synthesis ==
Addition of hydroxylamine to methyl para-cyano-benzoate 3 gave the amidoxime 4 which was coupled with the acid 5 to give after hydrolysis the 4-(5-(4,7-dimethylbenzofuran-2-yl)-1,2,4-oxadiazol-3-yl) benzoic acid C286.

Synthetic Route to retinoic acid receptor beta (RARβ) agonist C268

== History ==
Although many synthetic selective RARα, RARβ, and RARγ agonists have been designed and prepared, these have generally been highly lipophilic acids without good drug-like properties and with low oral bioavailability. Recently this has been changing and drug design approaches to highly potent and selective RARα and RARβ agonists with low lipophilicity that are orally bioavailable and less toxic have been developed. A key element of this success has been the incorporation of heterocyclic linkers culminating in the discovery of the selective RAR beta agonist C286 showing high solubility and good oral pharmacokinetics. C286 is currently in Phase I clinical trials (ISRCTN12424734).
