= LY2955303 =

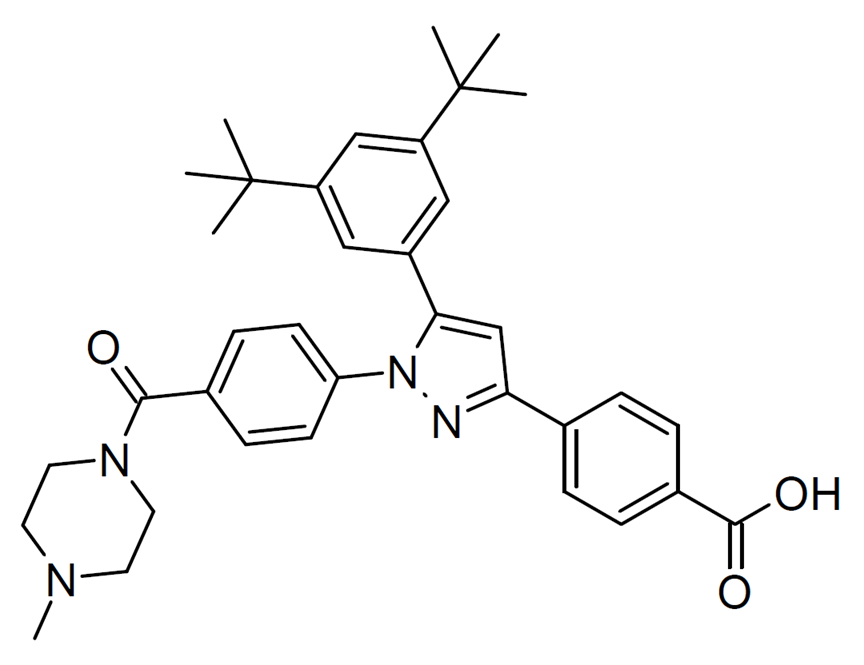

Identifiers
- IUPAC name: 4-[5-(3,5-di-tert-butylphenyl)-1-[4-(4-methylpiperazine-1-carbonyl)phenyl]-1H-pyrazol-3-yl]benzoic acid
- CAS Number: 1433497-19-8
- PubChem CID: 71552369
- UNII: EGR6ZG7M0Z
- ChEMBL: ChEMBL3814815

Chemical and physical data
- Formula: C_{36}H_{42}N_{4}O_{3}
- Molar mass: 578.757 g·mol^{−1}
- 3D model (JSmol): Interactive image
- SMILES: CC(C)(C)C1=CC(=CC(=C1)C2=CC(=NN2C3=CC=C(C=C3)C(=O)N4CCN(CC4)C)C5=CC=C(C=C5)C(=O)O)C(C)(C)C
- InChI: InChI=1S/C36H42N4O3/c1-35(2,3)28-20-27(21-29(22-28)36(4,5)6)32-23-31(24-8-10-26(11-9-24)34(42)43)37-40(32)30-14-12-25(13-15-30)33(41)39-18-16-38(7)17-19-39/h8-15,20-23H,16-19H2,1-7H3,(H,42,43); Key:YVXYHNKIOFSFMZ-UHFFFAOYSA-N

LY2955303 is a drug which acts as a potent and selective antagonist of the retinoic acid receptor γ (RARγ). It inhibits the signalling pathway of the pro-inflammatory mediator NF-κB and has been researched as a potential treatment for arthritis.
