= LE135 =

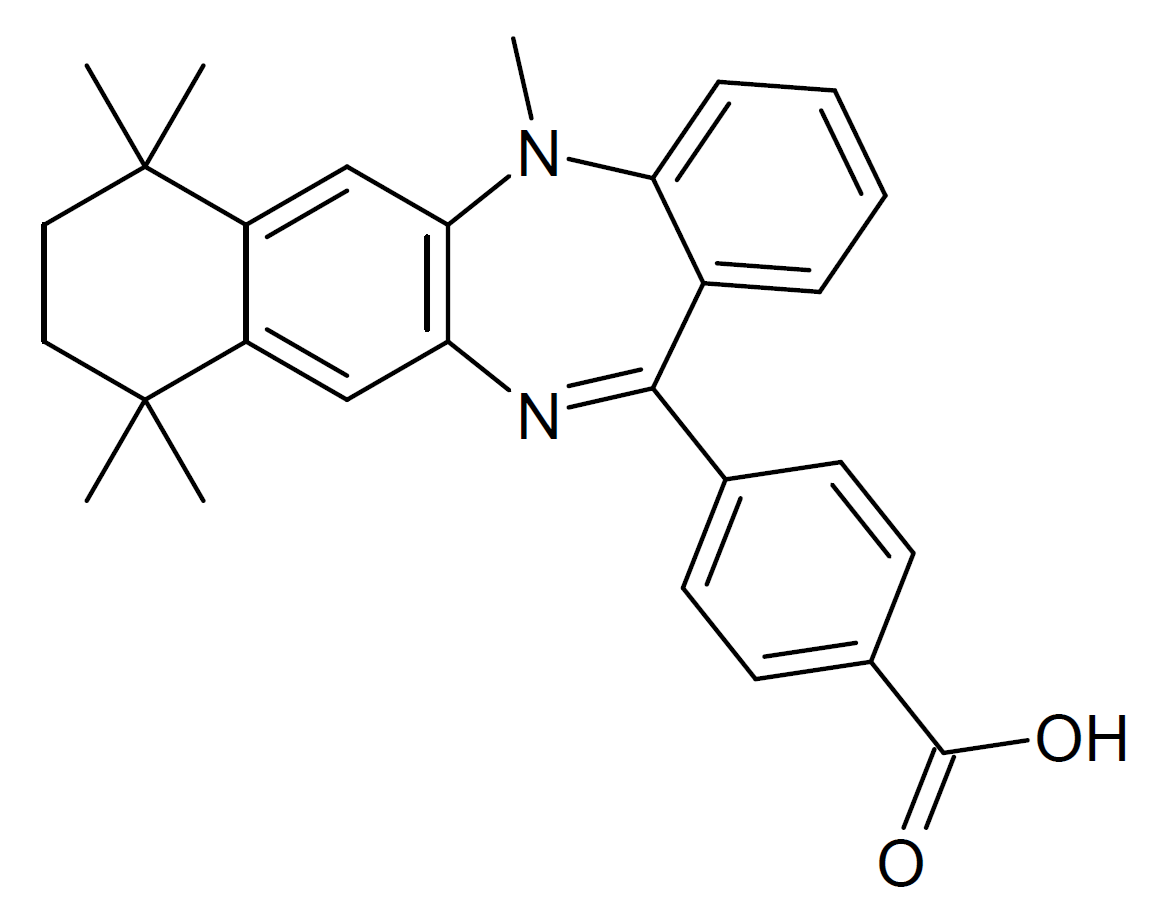

Identifiers
- IUPAC name: 4-(5,7,7,10,10-pentamethyl-8,9-dihydronaphtho[2,3-b][1,4]benzodiazepin-13-yl)benzoic acid
- CAS Number: 155877-83-1
- PubChem CID: 10410894
- IUPHAR/BPS: 3433
- ChemSpider: 8586331
- ChEBI: CHEBI:92124
- ChEMBL: ChEMBL37708
- CompTox Dashboard (EPA): DTXSID70439469

Chemical and physical data
- Formula: C_{29}H_{30}N_{2}O_{2}
- Molar mass: 438.571 g·mol^{−1}
- 3D model (JSmol): Interactive image
- SMILES: CC1(CCC(C2=CC3=C(C=C21)N=C(C4=CC=CC=C4N3C)C5=CC=C(C=C5)C(=O)O)(C)C)C
- InChI: InChI=1S/C29H30N2O2/c1-28(2)14-15-29(3,4)22-17-25-23(16-21(22)28)30-26(18-10-12-19(13-11-18)27(32)33)20-8-6-7-9-24(20)31(25)5/h6-13,16-17H,14-15H2,1-5H3,(H,32,33); Key:YZZAIQOVMHVWBS-UHFFFAOYSA-N

LE135 is a drug which acts as a selective retinoic acid receptor β (RARβ) antagonist. It was developed in the 1990s and has been widely used for research into the function of RARβ especially its roles in cell differentiation during growth, tissue repair and embryonic development, regulation of immune system function, and development of certain forms of cancer. However, it has also been shown to act as a potent activator of the cation channels TRPV1 and TRPA1, which means caution must be applied when interpreting results which assume that it is only acting by blocking RARβ.
