= BMS641 =

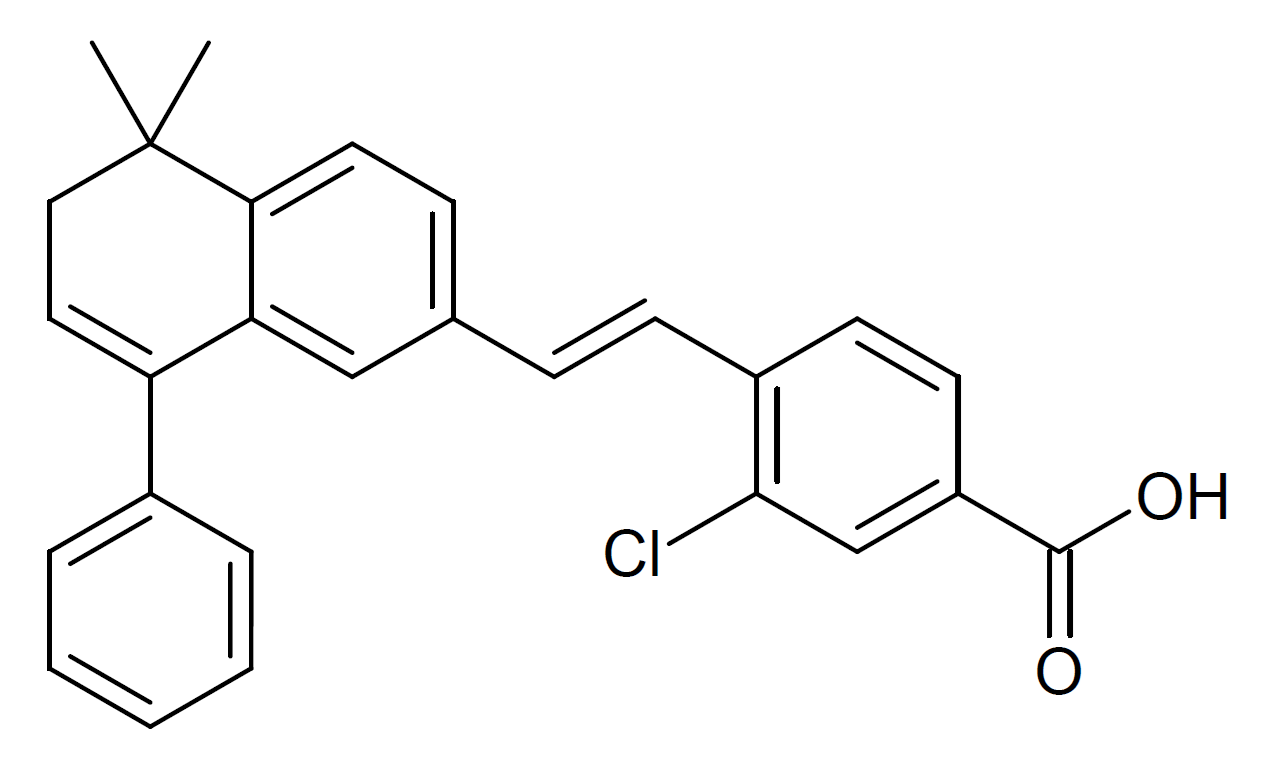

Identifiers
- IUPAC name: 3-chloro-4-[(E)-2-(5,5-dimethyl-8-phenyl-6H-naphthalen-2-yl)ethenyl]benzoic acid
- CAS Number: 369364-50-1
- PubChem CID: 22737393
- IUPHAR/BPS: 2651
- ChemSpider: 11612973
- ChEBI: CHEBI:230489
- PDB ligand: JYI (PDBe, RCSB PDB)

Chemical and physical data
- Formula: C_{27}H_{23}ClO_{2}
- Molar mass: 414.93 g·mol^{−1}
- 3D model (JSmol): Interactive image
- SMILES: CC1(CC=C(C2=C1C=CC(=C2)/C=C/C3=C(C=C(C=C3)C(=O)O)Cl)C4=CC=CC=C4)C
- InChI: InChI=1S/C27H23ClO2/c1-27(2)15-14-22(19-6-4-3-5-7-19)23-16-18(9-13-24(23)27)8-10-20-11-12-21(26(29)30)17-25(20)28/h3-14,16-17H,15H2,1-2H3,(H,29,30)/b10-8+; Key:FRTYVAKGTFXRNY-CSKARUKUSA-N

BMS641 (BMS-209641) is a drug which acts as a retinoic acid receptor β (RARβ) agonist. It is used for research into the function of RARβ in roles such as tissue differentiation during embryonic development, and the development of some forms of cancer.
