= Etretinate =

Chemical compound

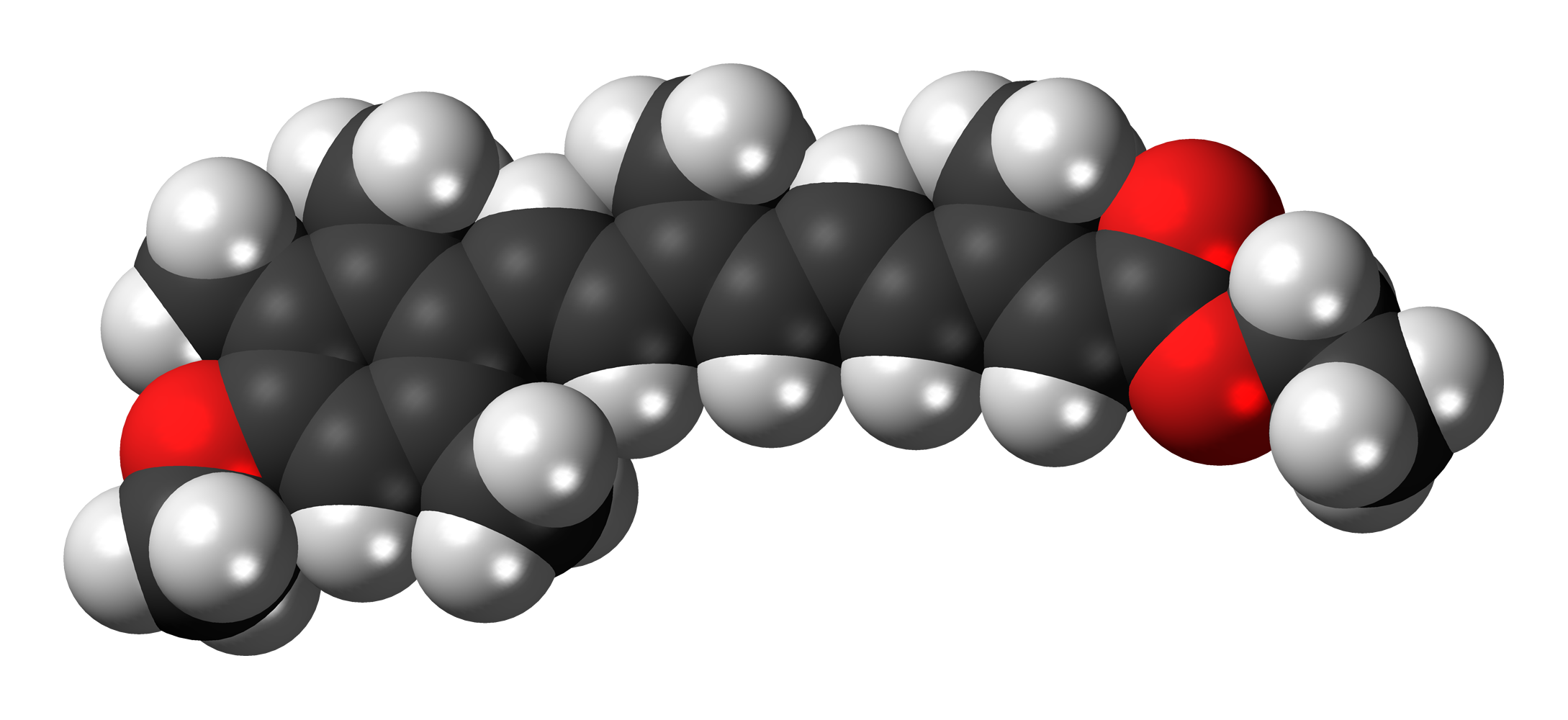

Clinical data
- Trade names: Tigason, formerly Tegison
- AHFS/Drugs.com: Drugs.com archive
- MedlinePlus: a601010
- Routes of administration: Oral
- ATC code: D05BB01 (WHO)

Legal status
- Legal status: BR: Class F4 (Other prohibited substances); US: Withdrawn

Pharmacokinetic data
- Protein binding: >99%
- Metabolites: Free acid, Z-form, chain shortening
- Elimination half-life: 120 days

Identifiers
- IUPAC name: Ethyl (2E,4E,6E,8E)-9-(4-methoxy-2,3,6-trimethylphenyl)-3,7-dimethyl-2,4,6,8-nonatetraenoate
- CAS Number: 54350-48-0
- PubChem CID: 5282375
- IUPHAR/BPS: 7599
- DrugBank: DB00926
- ChemSpider: 4445538
- UNII: 65M2UDR9AG
- KEGG: D00316
- ChEBI: CHEBI:4913
- ChEMBL: ChEMBL464
- CompTox Dashboard (EPA): DTXSID0023036
- ECHA InfoCard: 100.053.727

Chemical and physical data
- Formula: C_{23}H_{30}O_{3}
- Molar mass: 354.490 g·mol^{−1}
- 3D model (JSmol): Interactive image
- SMILES: O=C(OCC)\C=C(\C=C\C=C(\C=C\c1c(cc(OC)c(c1C)C)C)C)C
- InChI: InChI=1S/C23H30O3/c1-8-26-23(24)14-17(3)11-9-10-16(2)12-13-21-18(4)15-22(25-7)20(6)19(21)5/h9-15H,8H2,1-7H3/b11-9+,13-12+,16-10+,17-14+; Key:HQMNCQVAMBCHCO-DJRRULDNSA-N

Etretinate (trade name Tegison) is a medication developed by Hoffmann–La Roche that was approved by the FDA in 1986 to treat severe psoriasis. It is a second-generation retinoid. It was subsequently removed from the Canadian market in 1996 and the United States market in 1998 due to the high risk of birth defects. It remains on the market in Japan as Tigason.

== Pharmacology ==
Etretinate is a highly lipophilic, aromatic retinoid. It is stored and released from adipose tissue, so its effects can continue long after dosage stops. It is detectable in the plasma for up to three years following therapy. Etretinate has a low therapeutic index and a long elimination half-life (t_{1/2}) of 120 days, which make dosing difficult.

Etretinate has been replaced by acitretin, the free acid (without the ethyl ester). While acitretin is less lipophilic and has a half-life of only 50 hours, it is partly metabolized to etretinate in the body, so that it is still a long-acting teratogen and pregnancy is prohibited for two years after therapy.

== Precautions ==
- Etretinate is a teratogen, and may cause birth defects long after use. Therefore, birth control is advised during therapy, and for at least three years after therapy has stopped.
- Etretinate should be avoided in children, as it may interfere with bone growth.
- If a patient has ever taken etretinate, they are not eligible to donate blood in the United States, the United Kingdom, the United Arab Emirates, Australia, Ireland or Québec, due to the risk of birth defects. In Japan, people may not donate blood for two years after ceasing to use the medication.

== Side effects ==
Side effects are those typical of hypervitaminosis A, most commonly

- bone or joint pain, stiffness; in long-term treatment diffuse idiopathic skeletal hyperostosis
- muscular or abdominal cramps
- dry, burning, itching eyelids
- unusual bruising

== History ==
Etretinate received FDA approval in 1986 for the treatment of severe psoriasis. However, it was voluntarily withdrawn from the Canadian market in 1996 and the United States market in 1998 due to its prolonged elimination half-life and significant teratogenic potential. Because the drug accumulates in adipose tissue, it can pose a high risk of birth defects for several years following the cessation of therapy. Etretinate was largely succeeded by its active metabolite, acitretin, which has a much shorter half-life and was approved by the FDA in 1996.

In Japan, the drug remains on market branded Tigason.

== See also ==
- Isotretinoin
- List of withdrawn drugs
