= Retinoic acid receptor gamma =

Protein-coding gene in the species Homo sapiens

RARG
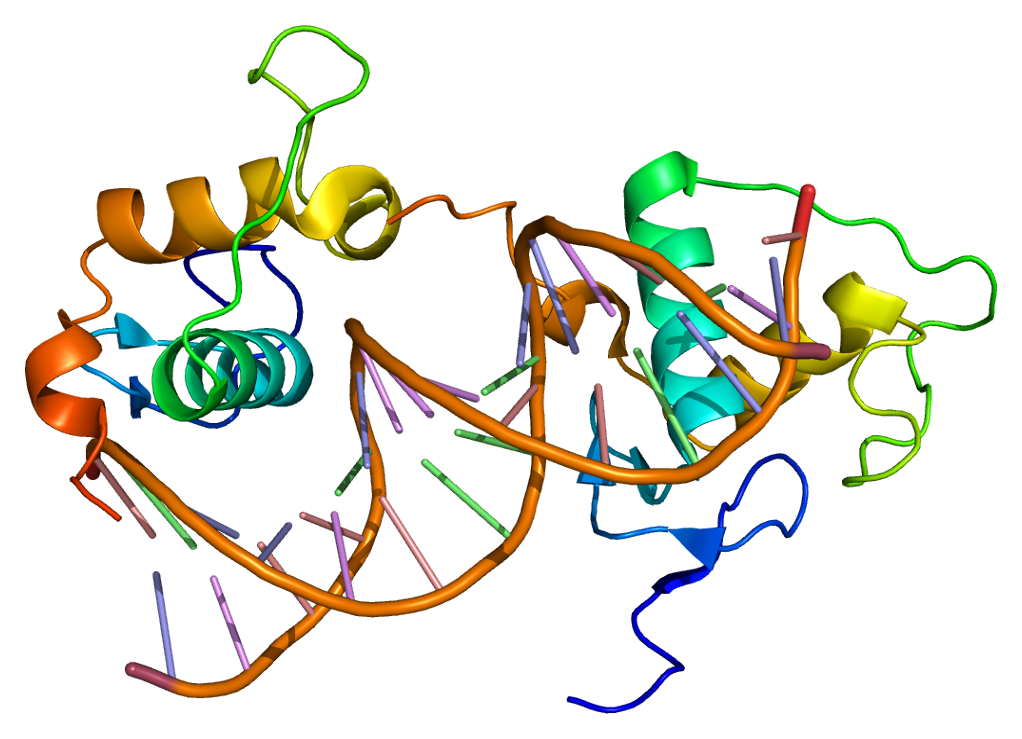

Identifiers
- Aliases: RARG, NR1B3, RARC, retinoic acid receptor gamma, RARgamma
- External IDs: OMIM: 180190; MGI: 97858; GeneCards: RARG
Available structures
PDB	Ortholog search: H3BMH6 PDBe H3BMH6 RCSB
PDB	List of PDB id codes 1EXA, 1EXX, 1FCX, 1FCY, 1FCZ, 1FD0, 2LBD, 3LBD, 4LBD

Gene location (Human)
Chr.	Chromosome 12 (human)
Band	12q13.13	Start	53,210,567 bp
Band	12q13.13	End	53,232,980 bp

Gene location (Mouse)
Chr.	Chromosome 15 (mouse)
Band	15 F2|15 57.4 cM	Start	102,143,373 bp
Band	15 F2|15 57.4 cM	End	102,165,952 bp
RNA expression pattern
Bgee	Human / Mouse (ortholog); Top expressed in: skin of leg; skin of abdomen; stromal cell of endometrium; ectocervix; canal of the cervix; right coronary artery; vagina; right uterine tube; apex of heart; tibial nerve / Top expressed in: axial skeleton; lip; human vertebral column; bones of pectoral girdle; sacrum; shoulder; cervical vertebral column; tail of embryo; ankle; vertebra; More reference expression data
BioGPS	n/a
Gene ontology
Molecular function	sequence-specific DNA binding; RNA polymerase II transcription regulatory region sequence-specific DNA binding; zinc ion binding; metal ion binding; steroid hormone receptor activity; protein binding; DNA-binding transcription factor activity; DNA binding; retinoid X receptor binding; DNA-binding transcription factor activity, RNA polymerase II-specific; transcription cis-regulatory region binding; transcription factor binding; nuclear receptor coactivator activity; signaling receptor activity; nuclear receptor activity
Cellular component	integral component of membrane; nucleoplasm; nucleus; transcription regulator complex; RNA polymerase II transcription regulator complex
Biological process	regulation of cell size; growth plate cartilage development; cellular response to retinoic acid; gland development; regulation of transcription, DNA-templated; negative regulation of cartilage development; response to retinoic acid; multicellular organism growth; negative regulation of cell differentiation; bone morphogenesis; chondrocyte development; negative regulation of apoptotic process; retinal pigment epithelium development; transcription, DNA-templated; epithelium development; embryonic camera-type eye development; reproductive structure development; limb development; face development; neural tube closure; negative regulation of chondrocyte differentiation; Harderian gland development; prostate gland epithelium morphogenesis; regulation of myelination; positive regulation of gene expression; retina development in camera-type eye; positive regulation of cell population proliferation; growth plate cartilage chondrocyte growth; canonical Wnt signaling pathway; regulation of gene expression; camera-type eye development; transcription initiation from RNA polymerase II promoter; regulation of myeloid cell differentiation; bone development; trachea cartilage development; anterior/posterior pattern specification; glandular epithelial cell development; steroid hormone mediated signaling pathway; negative regulation of transcription by RNA polymerase II; positive regulation of transcription by RNA polymerase II; embryonic hindlimb morphogenesis; retinoic acid receptor signaling pathway; negative regulation of cell population proliferation; embryonic eye morphogenesis; positive regulation of apoptotic process; positive regulation of programmed cell death; cellular response to leukemia inhibitory factor; multicellular organism development; hormone-mediated signaling pathway; cell differentiation; response to lipid
Sources:Amigo / QuickGO
Orthologs
Databases	NCBI: entry; OMA: entry
Species	Human	Mouse
Entrez	5916	19411
Ensembl	ENSG00000172819	ENSMUSG00000001288
UniProt	P13631	P18911
RefSeq (mRNA)	NM_000966; NM_001042728; NM_001243730; NM_001243731; NM_001243732	NM_001042727; NM_011244
RefSeq (protein)	NP_000957; NP_001036193; NP_001230659; NP_001230660; NP_001230661	NP_001036192; NP_035374
Location (UCSC)	Chr 12: 53.21 – 53.23 Mb	Chr 15: 102.14 – 102.17 Mb
PubMed search
- Wikidata
View/Edit Human	View/Edit Mouse

Retinoic acid receptor gamma (RAR-γ), also known as NR1B3 (nuclear receptor subfamily 1, group B, member 3) is a nuclear receptor encoded by the RARG gene. Adapalene selectively targets retinoic acid receptor beta and retinoic acid receptor gamma and its agonism of the gamma subtype is largely responsible for adapalene's observed effects.

== Interactions ==
Retinoic acid receptor gamma has been shown to interact with NCOR1.

== Ligands ==
Agonists

- Adapalene (also agonist at RARβ and weakly at RARα)
- CD1530
- Tazarotene (mixed RARβ/RARγ agonist, selective over RARα)
- Trifarotene (RARγ selective)

Antagonists

- LY2955303
- MM11253

== See also ==
- Retinoic acid receptor
