= Tazarotene =

Topical retinoid medication

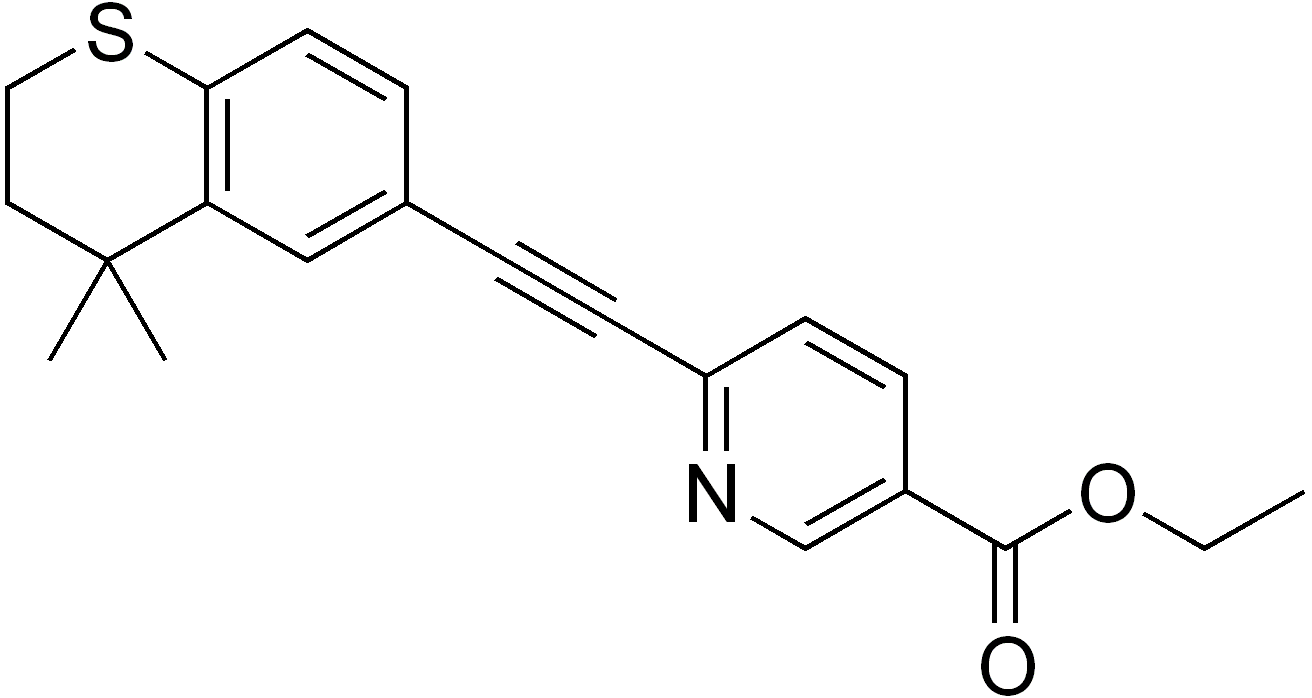

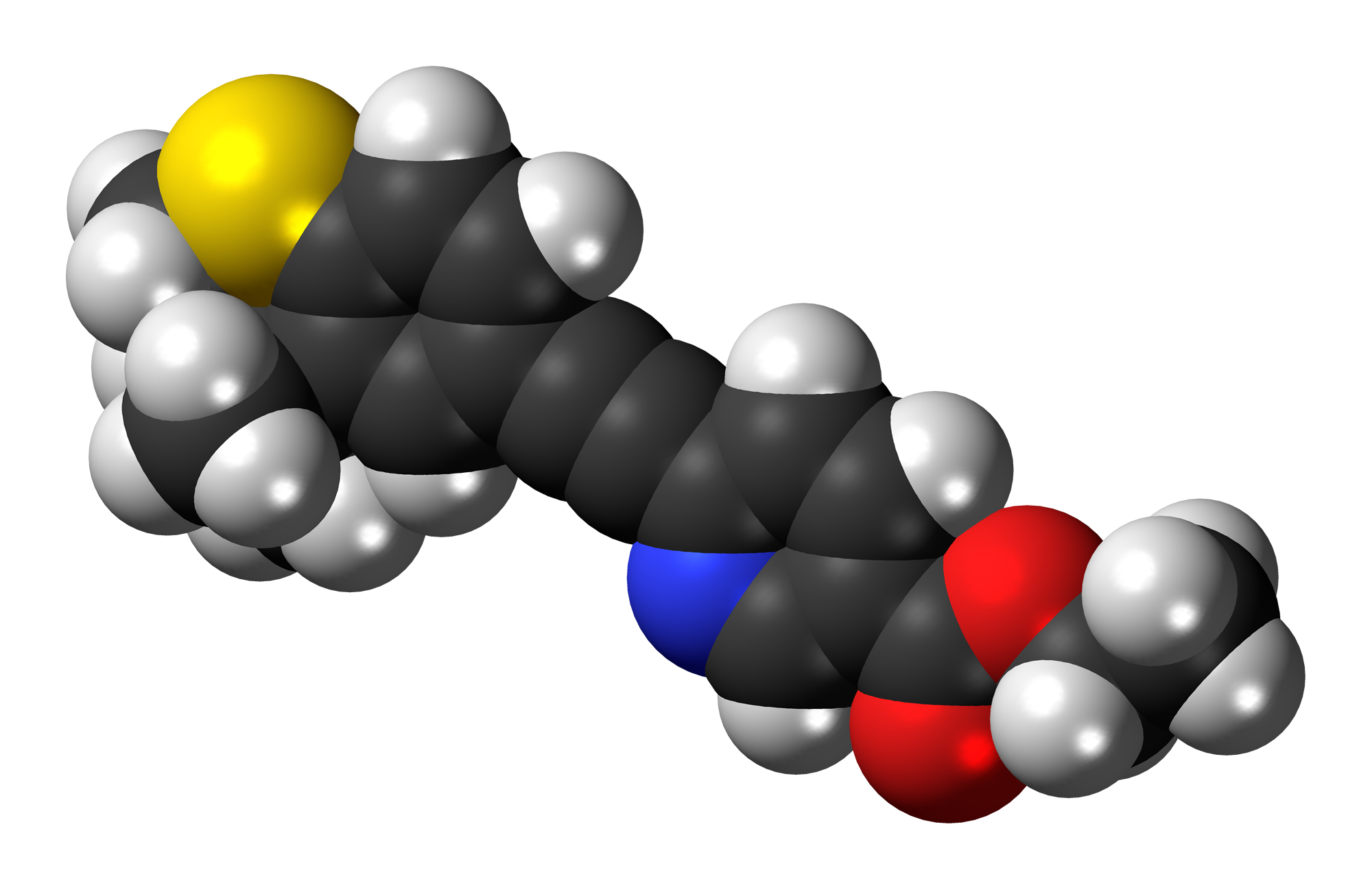

Clinical data
- Trade names: Tazorac, Arazlo, Fabior, others
- AHFS/Drugs.com: Monograph
- MedlinePlus: a616052
- License data: US DailyMed: Tazarotene
- Routes of administration: Topical
- ATC code: D05AX05 (WHO) D05AX55 (WHO) (combination with ulobetasol)

Legal status
- Legal status: CA: ℞-only / Schedule D; US: ℞-only; In general: ℞ (Prescription only)

Pharmacokinetic data
- Protein binding: >99%
- Elimination half-life: 19 Hours

Identifiers
- IUPAC name: ethyl 6-[2-(4,4-dimethyl-3,4-dihydro-2H-1-benzothiopyran-6-yl)ethynyl]pyridine-3-carboxylate
- CAS Number: 118292-40-3
- PubChem CID: 5381
- IUPHAR/BPS: 6952
- DrugBank: DB00799
- ChemSpider: 5188
- UNII: 81BDR9Y8PS
- KEGG: D01132
- ChEBI: CHEBI:32184
- ChEMBL: ChEMBL1657
- CompTox Dashboard (EPA): DTXSID5046691
- ECHA InfoCard: 100.115.380

Chemical and physical data
- Formula: C_{21}H_{21}NO_{2}S
- Molar mass: 351.46 g·mol^{−1}
- 3D model (JSmol): Interactive image
- SMILES: O=C(OCC)c1ccc(nc1)C#Cc3ccc2SCCC(c2c3)(C)C
- InChI: InChI=1S/C21H21NO2S/c1-4-24-20(23)16-7-9-17(22-14-16)8-5-15-6-10-19-18(13-15)21(2,3)11-12-25-19/h6-7,9-10,13-14H,4,11-12H2,1-3H3; Key:OGQICQVSFDPSEI-UHFFFAOYSA-N

Tazarotene, sold under the brand names Tazorac and Arazlo, among others, is a topical retinoid medication used to treat acne and plaque psoriasis. Certain formulations are also used to reduce signs of photoaging, including fine facial wrinkles and mottled pigmentation. It is a third-generation acetylenic retinoid and a prodrug that is converted to its active metabolite, tazarotenic acid.

Tazarotene was approved for medical use in 1997 and is available as a generic medication.

== Medical uses ==
Tazarotene is most commonly used topically to treat acne vulgaris, psoriasis, and photoaging. Like other topical retinoids, such as tretinoin and adapalene, tazarotene can be used in a regimen with benzoyl peroxide and/or an oral antibiotic, such as clindamycin or dapsone, for the treatment of acne. This results in increased efficacy compared to tazarotene monotherapy.

Combination therapy utilizing tazarotene alongside a mid- to high-potency corticosteroid is more effective in treating psoriasis compared to monotherapy of either drug.

Tazarotene can also be used for the treatment of photodamaged skin. It can reduce the histological and clinical signs of photodamaged skin, such as fine lines, wrinkles, hyperpigmentation, and lentigo. The therapy is more effective when used with the daily application of sunscreen.

=== Available forms ===
Tazarotene is available in several topical formulations, including gels, creams, foams, and lotions, with concentrations ranging from 0.045% to 0.1%. Tazarotene was first approved in 1997 as a 0.05% and 0.1% gel, followed by 0.05% and 0.1% creams in 2000. In 2012, a 0.1% aerosol foam was introduced to provide easier application to hair-bearing or large surface areas of the skin. A 0.045% lotion was approved in 2019, which utilizes a polymeric emulsion technology to stabilize the active ingredient at a lower concentration with increased absorption. Tazarotene is also available as a fixed-dose combination drug in the topical formulation of halobetasol/tazarotene for use in psoriasis.

== Contraindications ==
Tazarotene is contraindicated for use in patients who are known to be or suspected of being pregnant. Tazarotene is a known teratogen.

=== Pregnancy ===
Before 2015, tazarotene was considered a Category X drug (meaning its use was contraindicated during pregnancy) according to US Food and Drug Administration (FDA) guidelines, despite demonstrating similar plasma retinoid levels as adapalene and tretinoin, which were classified as Category C drugs. Under the FDA's updated Pregnancy and Lactation Labeling Rule which eliminated the lettered pregnancy categories and came into effect in 2015, tazarotene was determined to be contraindicated in pregnancy. Because of the lack of pregnancy outcomes data for the drug, the determination was based on the teratogenic effects observed in rat and rabbit studies.

== Adverse effects ==
Adverse effects for tazarotene include skin irritation, such as redness, itchiness, and burning. In patients with psoriasis, these adverse effects can be mitigated by a combined treatment with either mometasone furoate or fluocinonide. These effects tend to be mild to moderate, and increase in intensity as tazarotene concentration increases.

== Pharmacology ==
=== Mechanism of action ===
Tazarotene is selective for two types of retinoic acid receptors, RAR-γ and RAR-β. Like all retinoids, it affects the ability of keratinocytes in the epidermis to proliferate and differentiate. It does so by upregulating filaggrin expression and downregulating the expression of keratinocyte transglutaminase, ornithine decarboxylase, involucrin, epidermal growth factor receptor, and various keratins.

=== Pharmacokinetics ===
More than 99% of tazarotenic acid, the active metabolite of tazarotene, in the blood binds to plasma proteins (the most predominant being albumin). The volume of distribution (V_{D}) for tazarotene is 26.1 L/kg and the V_{D} for tazarotenic acid is 1.97 L/kg. Tazarotene is excreted from the body via feces and urine equally, and it has an elimination half-life of 16 to 18 hours.

== Synthesis ==
Acetylenic retinoid prodrug converted to the active metabolite, tazarotenic acid, with selective affinity for retinoic acid receptors RARβ and RARγ.

Tazarotene synthesis

The formation of the ring system involves first alkylation of the anion from thiophenol with dimethylallyl bromide (1) to give the thioether (2). Friedel-Crafts cyclization of the olefin with the equivalent of PPA then gives the thiopyran (3). Acylation with acetyl chloride in the presence of aluminium chloride gives the methyl ketone (4). Reaction of the enolate of that ketone with diethyl chlorophosphate gives the enol phosphate 5 as a transient intermediate. This eliminates diethyl phosphite in the presence of excess base to give the corresponding acetylene 6. The anion from the reaction of the acetylene with base is then used to displace chlorine from Ethyl 6-chloronicotinate (7). This reaction affords the coupling product tazarotene (8).

== Research ==
=== Melanoma ===
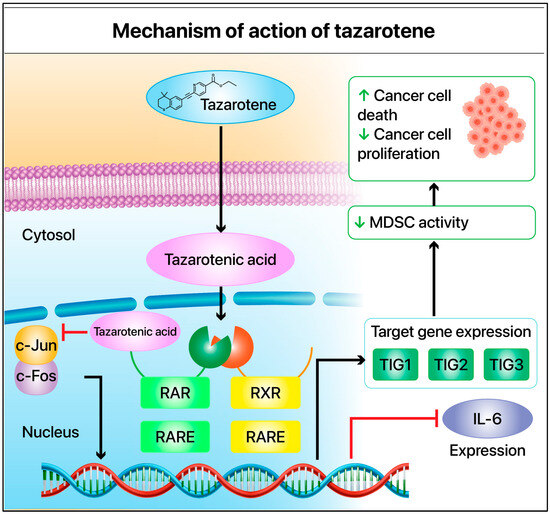
Mechanism of action of tazarotene

It is believed that Tazarotene may inhibit melanoma growth through the tazarotene-induced genes (TIG) family (TIG1, TIG2, TIG3) by specifically suppressing the mTOR pathway, inducing endoplasmic reticulum stress, and promoting cell differentiation and apoptosis. It further modulates the tumor microenvironment by enhancing immune surveillance (primarily through TIG2-mediated recruitment of natural killer and T cells) and may reduce pro-tumorigenic inflammatory markers like IL-6. These mechanisms collectively suppress myeloid-derived suppressor cells (MDSC), tumor proliferation, invasion, and metastasis, positioning tazarotene-regulated pathways as potential targets for melanoma immunotherapy.
