= Melanizing agent =

Class of pharmaceutical compounds

Melanizing agents are drugs that increase sensitivity to solar radiation and promote re-pigmentation of de-pigmented areas of skin. Furocoumarins stimulate melanocytes and induce their proliferation on activation by light. Melanizing agents sensitize the skin to sunlight. As a result, erythema, inflammation and pigmentation occurs.

== Drugs ==
Psoralen is a natural drug obtained from the fruit of Psoralea corylifolia. methoxsalen and trioxsalen are synthetic psoralens. These drugs can be used either topically or orally.

=== Topical therapy ===
The drug solution is painted on the vitiliginous lesion and exposed to sunlight for around one minute. It is then occluded by a sunscreen ointment. The treatment should be undertaken for many weeks to obtain observable results. Longer exposure to sunlight might cause blistering of skin, so the therapy should be undertaken in the direct supervision of a physician.

=== Oral therapy ===
It is done in alternate days. After 2 hours of taking the oral dose of 20 mg/day of a psoralen, skin is exposed to sunlight. Eyes, ears and other normally pigmented areas should be protected while spending time in the sun.

== See also ==
- Melanin
