= Trioxsalen =

Names
- Preferred IUPAC name 2,5,9-Trimethyl-7H-furo[3,2-g][1]benzopyran-7-one

Identifiers
| CAS Number | 3902-71-4 |
| 3D model (JSmol) | Interactive image |
| ChEBI | CHEBI:28329 |
| ChEMBL | ChEMBL1475 |
| ChemSpider | 5383 |
| DrugBank | DB04571 |
| ECHA InfoCard | 100.021.327 |
| KEGG | D01034 |
| PubChem CID | 5585 |
| UNII | Y6UY8OV51T |
| CompTox Dashboard (EPA) | DTXSID3023716 |
- InChI: InChI=1S/C14H12O3/c1-7-4-12(15)17-14-9(3)13-10(6-11(7)14)5-8(2)16-13/h4-6H,1-3H3 Key: FMHHVULEAZTJMA-UHFFFAOYSA-N; InChI=1/C14H12O3/c1-7-4-12(15)17-14-9(3)13-10(6-11(7)14)5-8(2)16-13/h4-6H,1-3H3 Key: FMHHVULEAZTJMA-UHFFFAOYAF
- SMILES: Cc1cc2c(o1)c(C)c1c(c2)c(C)cc(=O)o1

Properties
| Chemical formula | C_{14}H_{12}O_{3} |
| Molar mass | 228.24328 |

Pharmacology
| ATC code | D05AD01 (WHO) D05BA01 (WHO) |
- Except where otherwise noted, data are given for materials in their standard state (at 25 °C [77 °F], 100 kPa). verify (what is ?) Infobox references

Trioxsalen (trimethylpsoralen (TMP), trioxysalen (INN) or Trisoralen) is a furanocoumarin and a psoralen derivative. It is obtained from several plants, mainly Psoralea corylifolia. Like other psoralens it causes photosensitization of the skin, and is a melanizing agent. It is administered either topically or orally in conjunction with UV-A (the least damaging form of ultraviolet light) for phototherapy treatment of vitiligo and hand eczema. After photoactivation it creates interstrand cross-links in DNA, which can cause programmed cell death unless repaired by cellular mechanisms. In research it can be conjugated to dyes for confocal microscopy and used to visualize sites of DNA damage. The compound is also being explored for development of antisense oligonucleotides that can be cross-linked specifically to a mutant mRNA sequence without affecting normal transcripts differing at even a single base pair.

Trioxsalen (abbreviated as TMP) activated by UV-A exposure is commonly used in genetics research as an experimental mutagen. UV/TMP generates small deletions (~1-3 Kbp), but all base transitions and transversions can also be obtained.
