= CD2314 =

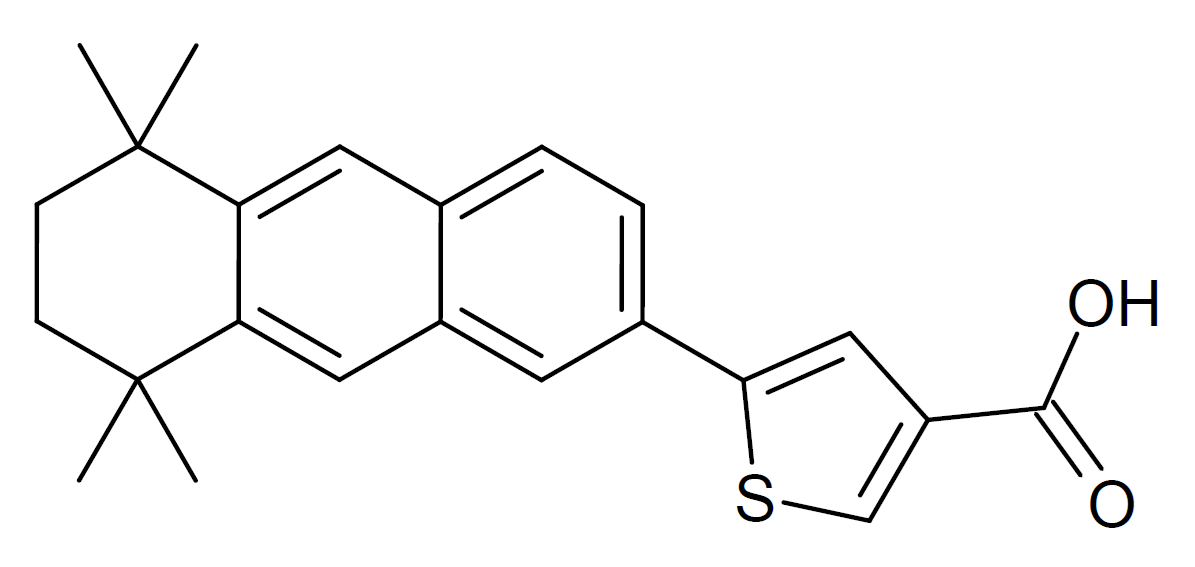

Clinical data
- Other names: CD-2314; CD 2314

Identifiers
- IUPAC name: 5-(5,5,8,8-tetramethyl-6,7-dihydroanthracen-2-yl)thiophene-3-carboxylic acid
- CAS Number: 170355-37-0
- PubChem CID: 15293210
- IUPHAR/BPS: 8906
- ChemSpider: 13982144

Chemical and physical data
- Formula: C_{23}H_{24}O_{2}S
- Molar mass: 364.50 g·mol^{−1}
- 3D model (JSmol): Interactive image
- SMILES: CC1(CCC(C2=C1C=C3C=CC(=CC3=C2)C4=CC(=CS4)C(=O)O)(C)C)C
- InChI: InChI=1S/C23H24O2S/c1-22(2)7-8-23(3,4)19-11-16-9-15(6-5-14(16)10-18(19)22)20-12-17(13-26-20)21(24)25/h5-6,9-13H,7-8H2,1-4H3,(H,24,25); Key:URUSABQSUCBGGJ-UHFFFAOYSA-N

CD2314 is a drug which acts as a retinoic acid receptor β (RARβ) agonist. It is used for research into the function of RARβ and promotes nerve repair following injury.
