= Acitretin =

Chemical compound

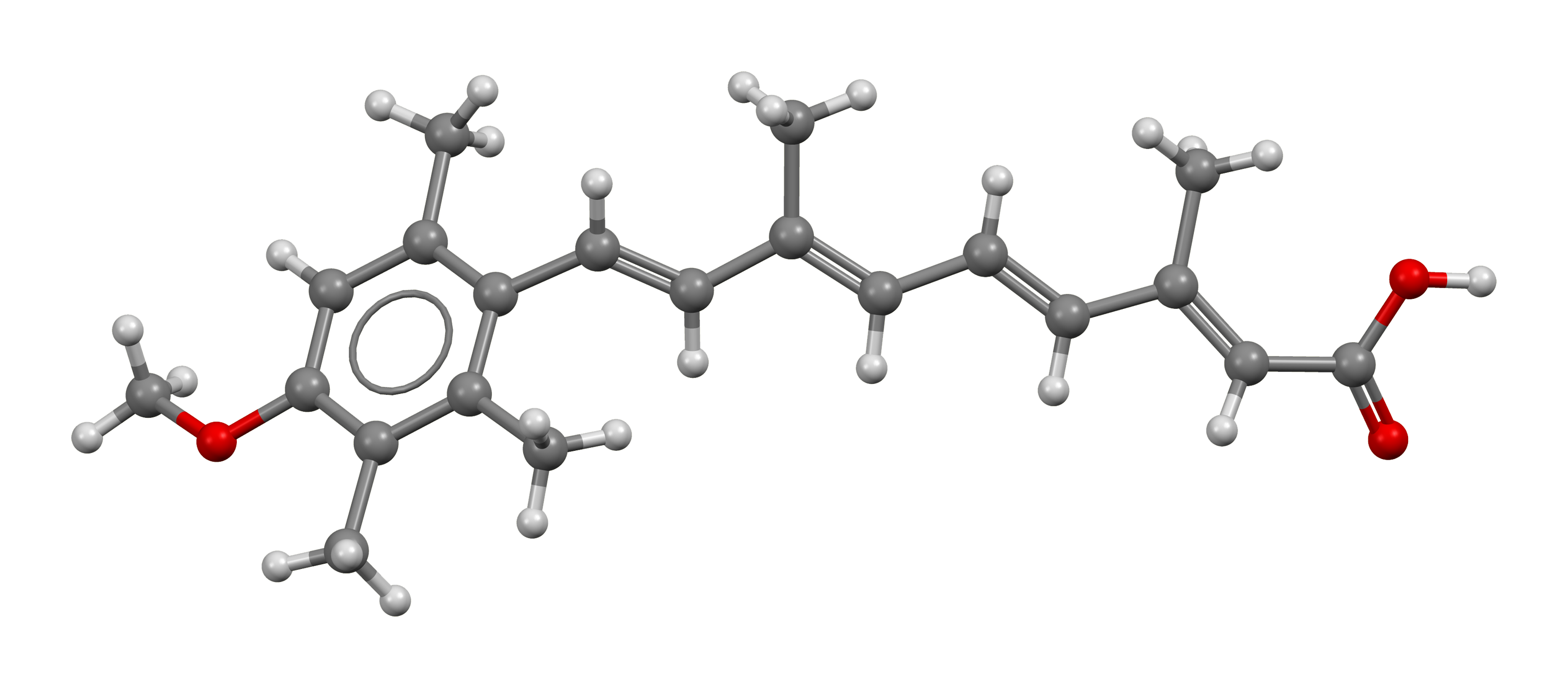

Clinical data
- Trade names: Soriatane, Neotigason
- AHFS/Drugs.com: Monograph
- MedlinePlus: a601010
- Pregnancy category: AU: X (High risk)
- Routes of administration: By mouth
- ATC code: D05BB02 (WHO)

Legal status
- Legal status: AU: S4 (Prescription only); BR: Class C2 (Retinoids); CA: ℞-only; UK: POM (Prescription only); US: ℞-only

Pharmacokinetic data
- Bioavailability: 60%
- Protein binding: >99.9%
- Metabolism: Liver
- Elimination half-life: 49 hours
- Excretion: Faeces & urine

Identifiers
- IUPAC name: (2E,4E,6E,8E)-9-(4-methoxy-2,3,6-trimethylphenyl)-3,7-dimethylnona-2,4,6,8-tetraenoic acid
- CAS Number: 55079-83-9
- PubChem CID: 5284513
- IUPHAR/BPS: 7598
- DrugBank: DB00459
- ChemSpider: 4447573
- UNII: LCH760E9T7
- KEGG: D02754
- ChEBI: CHEBI:50173
- ChEMBL: ChEMBL1131
- CompTox Dashboard (EPA): DTXSID6022553
- ECHA InfoCard: 100.054.050

Chemical and physical data
- Formula: C_{21}H_{26}O_{3}
- Molar mass: 326.436 g·mol^{−1}
- 3D model (JSmol): Interactive image
- SMILES: O=C(O)\C=C(\C=C\C=C(\C=C\c1c(cc(OC)c(c1C)C)C)C)C
- InChI: InChI=1S/C21H26O3/c1-14(8-7-9-15(2)12-21(22)23)10-11-19-16(3)13-20(24-6)18(5)17(19)4/h7-13H,1-6H3,(H,22,23)/b9-7+,11-10+,14-8+,15-12+; Key:IHUNBGSDBOWDMA-AQFIFDHZSA-N

Acitretin, sold under the brand names Neotigason and Soriatane, is a second-generation retinoid. It is taken orally, and is typically used for psoriasis. It was patented in Germany in 1974 and approved for medical use in the United States in 1996.

Acitretin is an oral retinoid used in the treatment of severe resistant psoriasis. Because of the potential for problems and severe side effects it is generally used in only very severe cases of psoriasis that have been unresponsive to other treatments. It binds to nuclear receptors that regulates gene transcription. They induce keratinocyte differentiation and reduce epidermal hyperplasia, leading to the slowing of cell reproduction. Acitretin is readily absorbed and widely distributed after oral administration. A therapeutic effect occurs after two to four weeks or longer.

Patients who have received the medication are advised against giving blood for at least three years due to the risk of birth defects.

== Adverse effects ==
Acitretin is highly teratogenic and noted for the possibility of severe birth defects, such as abnormal development in the face and skull, as well as spinal, hip, forearm, and ear deformations. It should not be used by pregnant women or women planning to get pregnant within 3 years following the use of acitretin. Sexually active women of childbearing age who use acitretin should also use at least two forms of birth control concurrently. Men and women who use it should not donate blood for three years after using it, because of the possibility that the blood might be used in a pregnant patient and cause birth defects.

In addition, it may cause nausea, headache, itching, dry, red or flaky skin, dry or red eyes, dry or chapped lips, swollen lips, dry mouth, thirst, cystic acne or hair loss.

== Pharmacokinetics ==
Acitretin is a metabolite of etretinate, which it has largely replaced. Etretinate was discontinued in most markets because it had a narrow therapeutic index as well as a long elimination half-life (t_{1/2} = 120 days), making dosing difficult. In contrast, acitretin's half-life is approximately 2 days. However, acitretin can be reverse-metabolized back into etretinate, particularly after alcohol has been consumed. As a result of this long half-life potential, women must avoid becoming pregnant for at least three years after discontinuing acitretin. Therefore, acitretin is generally not recommended for women of child-bearing age with a risk of becoming pregnant.
