= Dithranol =

Chemical compound

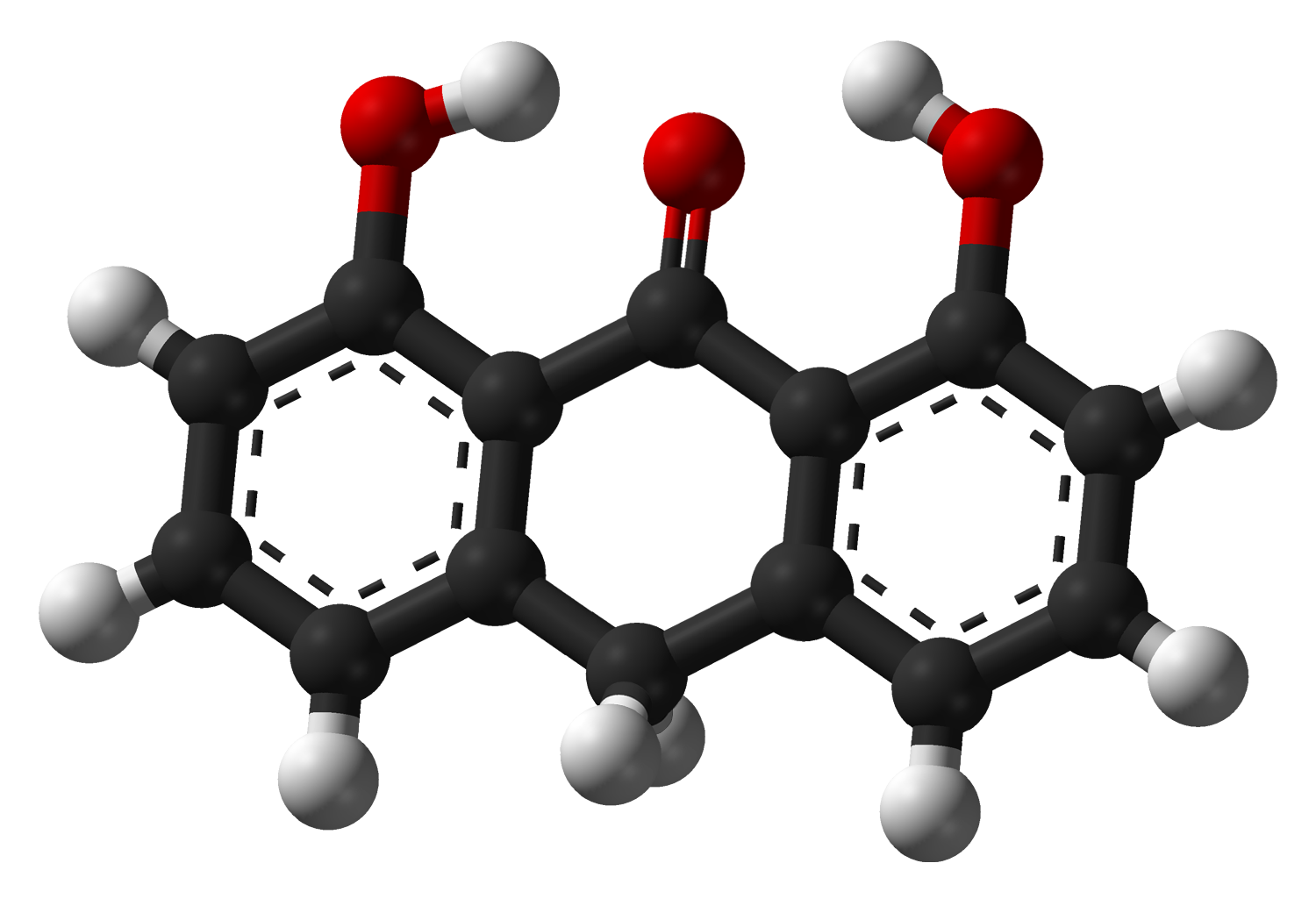

Clinical data
- AHFS/Drugs.com: Micromedex Detailed Consumer Information
- Pregnancy category: AU: B2
- Routes of administration: topical
- ATC code: D05AC01 (WHO)

Legal status
- Legal status: UK: P (Pharmacy medicines)

Pharmacokinetic data
- Bioavailability: 0%, trace amounts metabolites
- Protein binding: 0%
- Metabolism: absorbed and oxidised within the skin
- Elimination half-life: n/a
- Excretion: n/a

Identifiers
- IUPAC name: 1,8-dihydroxy-9,10-dihydroanthracen-9-one
- CAS Number: 1143-38-0
- PubChem CID: 2202
- ChemSpider: 2117
- UNII: U8CJK0JH5M
- KEGG: D00233
- ChEBI: CHEBI:37510
- ChEMBL: ChEMBL46469
- CompTox Dashboard (EPA): DTXSID7024538
- ECHA InfoCard: 100.013.216

Chemical and physical data
- Formula: C_{14}H_{10}O_{3}
- Molar mass: 226.231 g·mol^{−1}
- 3D model (JSmol): Interactive image
- Melting point: 178 °C (352 °F)
- SMILES: O=C2c1c(O)cccc1Cc3c2c(O)ccc3
- InChI: InChI=1S/C14H10O3/c15-10-5-1-3-8-7-9-4-2-6-11(16)13(9)14(17)12(8)10/h1-6,15-16H,7H2; Key:NUZWLKWWNNJHPT-UHFFFAOYSA-N

Dithranol (INN) or anthralin (USAN and former BAN) is a hydroxyanthrone, anthracene derivative, and is used in medications applied to the skin of people with psoriasis. It is available as creams, ointment or pastes in 0.1 to 2% strengths (Drithocreme, Dithrocream, Zithranol-RR, Micanol, Psorlin, Dritho-Scalp, Anthraforte, Anthranol and Anthrascalp). The terms dithranol and anthralin are sometimes used synonymously.

== Medical uses ==
Dithranol has a slower onset of action in controlling psoriasis, typically several weeks, compared to glucocorticoid steroids, but is without the potential for rebound reaction on withdrawal. It cannot be used on the face or genitalia. There is some tentative evidence that anthralin might be useful for alopecia areata.

== Side effects ==
It temporarily stains the skin a yellowy-brown to purple if not washed off after a period of time (45-60 minutes). It permanently stains clothing fabrics, shower curtains, and other materials such as ceramic sinks the same yellow-brown to purple in color depending on the concentration. It may cause a local burning sensation and irritation; this may be minimised by careful attention to the details of treatment and only gradually stepping up through the strengths of dithranol formulations. The surrounding skin can be protected using soft white paraffin and the treated area is covered with tube gauze.

== Pharmacology ==
Dithranol accumulates in mitochondria where it interferes with the supply of energy to the cell, probably by the oxidation of dithranol releasing free radicals. This impedes DNA replication and so slows the excessive cell division that occurs in psoriatic plaques. In addition Dithranol may act by reducing the elevated levels of cGMP that occurs in psoriasis.

Anthralin is a synthetic compound whose precise mechanism of anti-psoriatic action is not yet fully understood. However, numerous studies have demonstrated anti-proliferative and anti-inflammatory effects of anthralin on psoriatic and normal skin. The anti-proliferative effects of anthralin appear to result from both an inhibition of DNA synthesis as well as from its strong reducing properties. Anthralin’s effectiveness as an anti-psoriatic agent has also been in part attributed to its abilities to induce lipid peroxidation and reduce levels of endothelial adhesion molecules which are markedly elevated in psoriatic patients. Unlike retinoids and PUVA, anthralin does not inhibit liver microsomal enzyme activity; consequently, the likelihood of adverse drug interactions is greatly reduced when other agents are administered concomitantly with anthralin.

More dithranol penetrates into impaired skin in 30 minutes than into intact skin during about 16 hours. For this reason weaker 0.1-0.5% preparations are applied over night, but stronger 1-2% products are applied for between 30 minutes and one hour depending upon the formulation.
