= Retinoid =

Group of tetraterpenes

1st, 2nd, 3rd-generation retinoid compounds

The retinoids are a class of chemical compounds consisting of vitamin A and related derivatives. Synthetic retinoids are utilized in cosmetic formulations, clinical dermatology, and the treatment of some forms of cancer.

Retinoids have many important functions throughout the body, including in vision, regulation of skin proliferation and differentiation, growth of bone tissue, immune function, and male fertility.

The biology of retinoids is complex, having well-documented effectiveness in the management of conditions ranging from acute promyelocytic leukemia to acne to photoaging. On the other hand, retinoids may be involved in metabolic dysfunction and, at least in some forms, carcinogenesis.

== Types ==
Retinoids are divided into four generations based on their molecular structure and receptor selectivity.

| Generation | Description | Compounds |
|---|---|---|
| Vitamin A | Natural vitamers of vitamin A, not directly active as RAR/RXR receptor agonists | retinol, retinal; various esters of the two |
| First gen. | Various retinoic acids, naturally produced in the body as active forms of the vitamin | tretinoin (all-trans), isotretinoin (13-cis), and alitretinoin (9-cis); various esters |
| Second gen. | Synthetic analogs formulated for oral dosing. There are no topically available second-generation formulations of retinoids. | etretinate and its metabolite acitretin |
| Third gen. | Retinoidal benzoic acid derivatives | adapalene, oleyl adapalenate, bexarotene, and tazarotene |
| Fourth gen. | Topical retinoid with selectivity towards the RAR receptor located in the epidermis | Trifarotene, seletinoid G |

== Structure ==
The basic structure of the hydrophobic retinoid molecule consists of a cyclic end group, a long polyene "body" chain, and a polar end group. The conjugated system formed by alternating C=C double bonds in the polyene side chain is responsible for the color of retinoids (typically yellow, orange, or red). Hence, many retinoids are chromophores. Alternation of side chains and end groups creates the various classes of retinoids.

First-generation retinoids are produced naturally in the body and interact with their normal biological counterparts. Retinol and retinal are forms of vitamin A and do not play an immediate role in signaling. They are activated by conversion into retinoic acids (RAs) at target tissues when needed. All-trans-retinoic acid and 9-cis-retinoic acid bind the retinoic acid receptors (RARs) and retinoid X receptors, a key signaling system in organ development. 13-cis retinoic acid has an unknown biological pathway but appears to act as a growth factor.

Second-generation retinoids (etretinate and acitretin) have a mixed effect and interact mainly with signaling in the skin.

Third generation retinoids have deviated from the natural isoprene structure, instead of using more rigid structures such as aromatic rings. This allows them to have narrower biological roles, with adapalene mimicking the effects of isotretinoin, bexarotene binding only the retinoid X receptors, and tazarotene binding the RAR-β and RAR-y forms.

The only fourth-generation retinoid, trifarotene, binds selectively to the RAR-y receptor. It was approved for use in the US in 2019.

== Pharmacokinetics ==
Interconversion of vitamin A forms and activation into retinoic acid

The major source of retinoids in the human diet is plant pigments such as carotenes and retinyl esters derived from animal sources. Retinyl esters are transported through the chylomicron pathway to the liver or fat tissue while retinol or carotenes are transported from the enterocytes to the liver and are processed into retinyl esters by LRAT for storage. Most synthetic retinoids are absorbed when taken orally, while topical retinoids cannot diffuse through the skin barrier unless it is compromised.

All classes of retinoid bind to many proteins. Retinol is delivered to cells by binding to retinol binding protein 4 (RBP4) in the bloodstream: RBP4 is a specific transporter for retinol and does not transport other forms. The other natural forms are mainly carried in chylomicrons and VLDL along with lipids. The fat-soluble synthetic forms likely also bind to chylomicrons and VLDL.

First generation retinoids are rapidly metabolized by cytochrome P450 enzymes, typically of the CYP26 family.

== Uses ==
Common skin conditions treated by topical retinoids include acne, psoriasis, and effects of photoaging. In addition, retinoids are used to treat some rare skin disorders, including discoid lupus and mycosis fungoides. In Japan, isotretinoin may be used for neuroblastoma treatment, but it is not approved in other countries due to a lack of consistency in studies of its effectiveness. Oral retinoids are readily toxic, requiring consistent clinical oversight, and are approved in several diseases for which said toxicity is paradoxically useful, including acute promyelocytic leukemia, cutaneous T-cell lymphoma, and heterotopic ossification.

== Toxicity ==
Toxic effects of retinoids occur with both acute and prolonged intake, depending on which retinoid is considered. The specific toxicity is related to the mechanism of action as well as exposure.

Retinoids (in the sense of RAR/RXR agonists) provoke rapid elevation of circulating triglycerides leading to hypertriglyceridemia as well as cholesterol, leading to hypercholesterolemia. Retinoids are further shown to worsen many metabolic diseases, such as diabetes and congestive heart failure. In addition to the harmful effects shared by other retinoids, bexarotene causes severe hypothyroidism.

A medical sign of chronic or acute poisoning with retinol is hypervitaminosis A, which includes the presence of painful, tender swellings on the long bones. Anorexia, skin lesions, hair loss, hepatosplenomegaly, papilloedema, bleeding, general malaise, pseudotumor cerebri, and death may also occur. Large-scale randomized, controlled clinical trials have conclusively shown that sub-toxic amounts of vitamin A supplementation increase mortality and cancer rates in smokers and asbestos workers. This is probably because of higher vitamin A load ends up increasing the amount of retinoic acids made in the body, increasing RAR/RXR activation.

=== Pregnancy ===
As mentioned before, RAR/RXR agonists (activators) are key signaling molecules in embryonic organ development. Their production (from vitamin A) and degradation are tightly controlled by cells to ensure that organs grow correctly. Any outside retinoid, produced without going through this system, will interfere with its working. The Pharmacovigilance Risk Assessment Committee (PRAC), based on its review, confirmed that taking oral retinoids during pregnancy can have harmful effects on the baby as they may cause CNS, cranio-facial, cardiovascular and other defects. The use of acitretin, alitretinoin and isotretinoin should be prohibited in women of childbearing age unless they take measures to prevent pregnancy.

Topical forms of retinoids cause less of a problem because a limited amount is absorbed through the skin, into the bloodstream, and delivered to the fetus. Still, out of an abundance of caution, use of topical tretinoin during the first trimester (during which most of the organ-forming process occurs) is not recommended. The Association of the American Academy of Dermatology states that "[r]etinoids should not be used during pregnancy." With that said, evidence for harm from topical use is lacking, and a large Nordic cohort study published in 2026 did not see any growth in birth defects despite a 3.3× raise in topical retinoid use during pregnancy.

Retinol and retinal esters, which are forms of vitamin A and not significant agonists of RAR and RXR, are normal parts of the human diet, routinely ingested by everyone including pregnant women. They are only associated with birth defects in the context of vitamin deficiency or excess. There is no evidence of them leading to birth defects in topical use. Only out of an abundance of caution, the AAD recommends consulting a healthcare provider before trying any lotions or oils for stretch mark prevention.

== See also ==
- Hypervitaminosis A
- Photoaging
