= Retinoic acid receptor beta =

Protein-coding gene in the species Homo sapiens

RARB
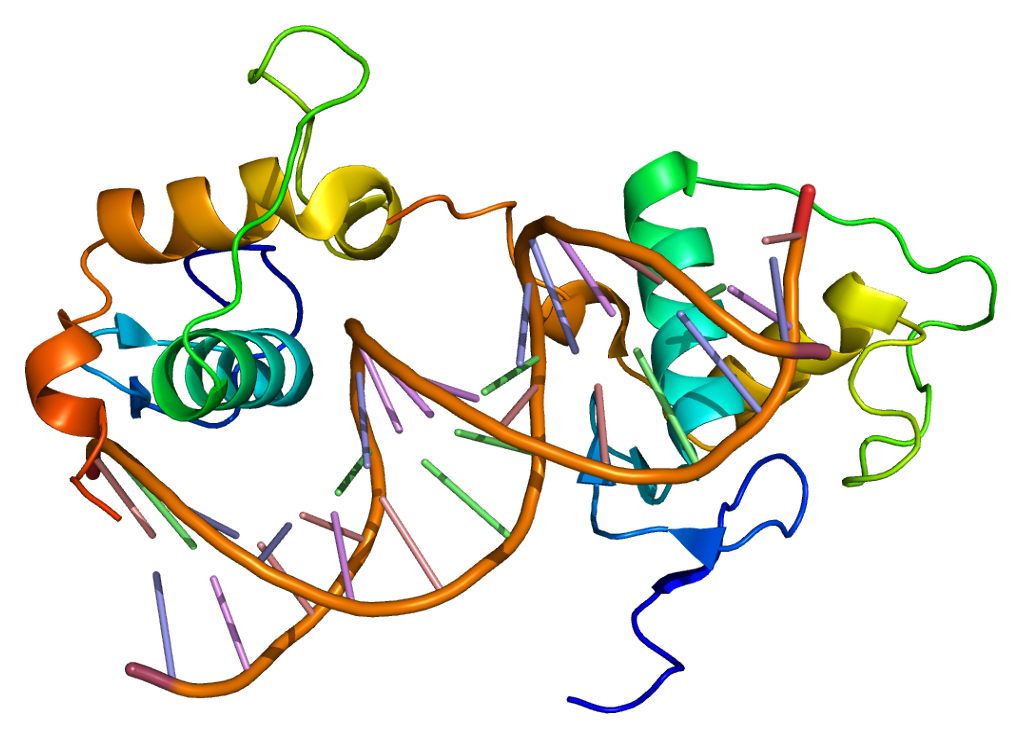

Identifiers
- Aliases: RARB, HAP, MCOPS12, NR1B2, RRB2, RARbeta1, retinoic acid receptor beta, RARbeta
- External IDs: OMIM: 180220; MGI: 97857; GeneCards: RARB
Available structures
PDB	Ortholog search: PDBe RCSB
PDB	List of PDB id codes 1HRA, 1XAP, 4DM6, 4DM8, 4JYG, 4JYH, 4JYI

Gene location (Human)
Chr.	Chromosome 3 (human)
Band	3p24.2	Start	24,687,887 bp
Band	3p24.2	End	25,597,932 bp

Gene location (Mouse)
Chr.	Chromosome 14 (mouse)
Band	14 A1|14 7.08 cM	Start	5,650,540 bp
Band	14 A1|14 7.08 cM	End	6,038,924 bp
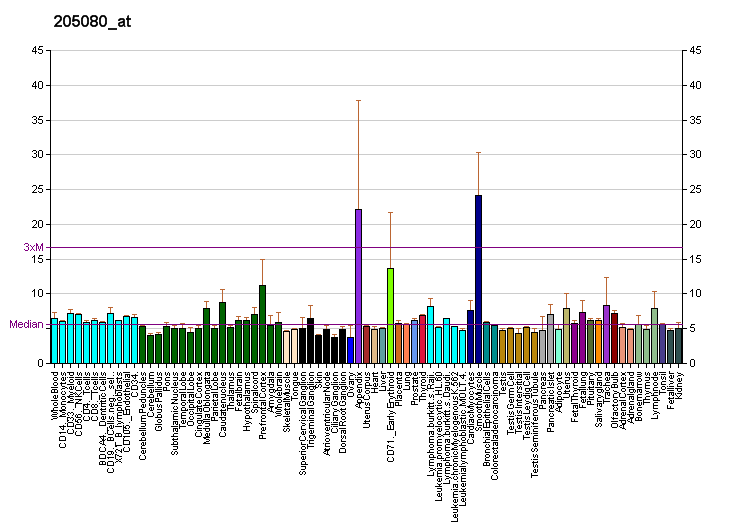

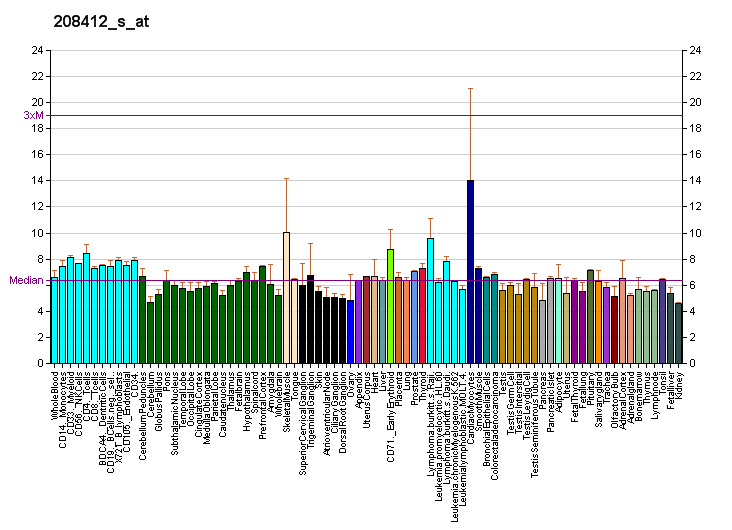

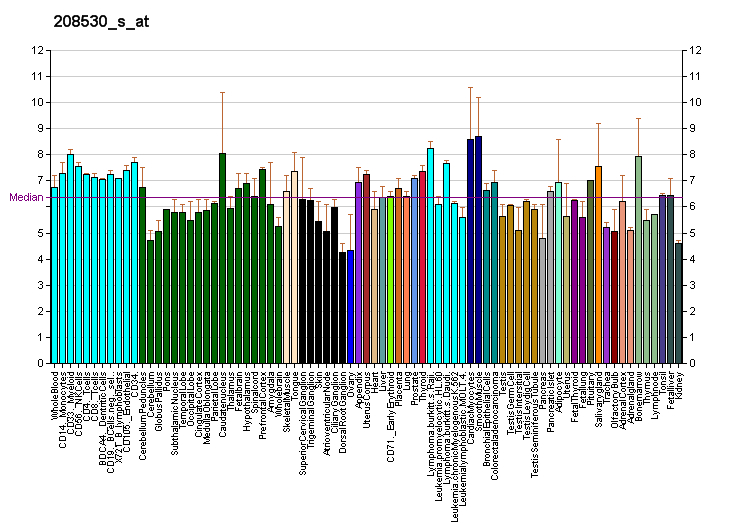
RNA expression pattern
Bgee	Human / Mouse (ortholog); Top expressed in: Epithelium of choroid plexus; palpebral conjunctiva; buccal mucosa cell; right lung; gonad; nucleus accumbens; caudate nucleus; olfactory zone of nasal mucosa; right auricle of heart; Achilles tendon / Top expressed in: olfactory tubercle; nucleus accumbens; wall of esophagus; stroma of kidney; mucosa of esophagus; epithelium of esophagus; genital tubercle; globus pallidus; abdominal wall; atrioventricular valve; More reference expression data
BioGPS	More reference expression data
Gene ontology
Molecular function	DNA binding; sequence-specific DNA binding; RNA polymerase II transcription regulatory region sequence-specific DNA binding; DNA-binding transcription factor activity; zinc ion binding; metal ion binding; steroid hormone receptor activity; protein binding; DNA-binding transcription factor activity, RNA polymerase II-specific; protein-containing complex binding; retinoid X receptor binding; transcription cis-regulatory region binding; transcription factor binding; nuclear receptor coactivator activity; signaling receptor activity; nuclear receptor activity
Cellular component	cytoplasm; nucleoplasm; nucleus; RNA polymerase II transcription regulator complex
Biological process	growth plate cartilage development; positive regulation of transcription by RNA polymerase II; neurogenesis; ureteric bud development; regulation of transcription, DNA-templated; negative regulation of cartilage development; multicellular organism growth; embryonic eye morphogenesis; positive regulation of programmed cell death; negative regulation of apoptotic process; negative regulation of transcription by RNA polymerase II; retinal pigment epithelium development; transcription, DNA-templated; outflow tract septum morphogenesis; negative regulation of chondrocyte differentiation; retinoic acid receptor signaling pathway; regulation of myelination; retina development in camera-type eye; positive regulation of neuron differentiation; positive regulation of cell population proliferation; positive regulation of apoptotic process; ventricular cardiac muscle cell differentiation; transcription initiation from RNA polymerase II promoter; bone development; embryonic digestive tract development; striatum development; signal transduction; negative regulation of cell population proliferation; glandular epithelial cell development; steroid hormone mediated signaling pathway; embryonic hindlimb morphogenesis; liver development; multicellular organism development; hormone-mediated signaling pathway; cell differentiation; response to retinoic acid; response to lipid; gland development; bone morphogenesis; epithelium development; cellular response to retinoic acid
Sources:Amigo / QuickGO
Orthologs
Databases	NCBI: entry; OMA: entry
Species	Human	Mouse
Entrez	5915	218772
Ensembl	ENSG00000077092	ENSMUSG00000017491
UniProt	P10826; Q5QHG3	P22605
RefSeq (mRNA)	NM_000965; NM_001290216; NM_001290217; NM_001290266; NM_001290276 NM_001290277; NM_001290300; NM_016152	NM_001289760; NM_001289761; NM_001289762; NM_011243
RefSeq (protein)	NP_000956; NP_001277145; NP_001277146; NP_001277195; NP_001277205 NP_001277206; NP_001277229; NP_057236; NP_001277146.1; NP_001277205.1; NP_057236.1	NP_001276689; NP_001276690; NP_001276691; NP_035373
Location (UCSC)	Chr 3: 24.69 – 25.6 Mb	Chr 14: 5.65 – 6.04 Mb
PubMed search
- Wikidata
View/Edit Human	View/Edit Mouse

Retinoic acid receptor beta (RAR-beta), also known as NR1B2 (nuclear receptor subfamily 1, group B, member 2) is a nuclear receptor that in humans is encoded by the RARB gene.

== Function ==
This gene encodes retinoic acid receptor beta, a member of the thyroid-steroid hormone receptor superfamily of nuclear transcriptional regulators. This receptor localizes to the cytoplasm and to subnuclear compartments. It binds retinoic acid, the biologically active form of vitamin A which mediates cellular signalling in embryonic morphogenesis, cell growth and differentiation. It is thought that this protein limits growth of many cell types by regulating gene expression. The gene was first identified in a hepatocellular carcinoma where it flanks a hepatitis B virus integration site. A deregulation of this gene has also been detected in uterine cervical carcinoma preneoplastic lesions. The gene expresses at least two transcript variants; one additional transcript has been described, but its full length nature has not been determined.

== Epigenetics ==
The Retinoic acid receptor beta aberrant promoter DNA hypermethylation has been observed associated with cancer onset/progression. Indeed, this improper epigenetic phenomenon has been observed in women affected by Vulvar Squamous cell carcinoma arose from vulver lichen sclerosus. Methylation of the Retinoic acid receptor beta promoter may be a marker of cancer risk in patients affected by this disease.

Missense mutations in the RARB gene can cause microphthalmia, syndromic 12 (MCOPS12), an ultra-rare and complex neurological disease.

== Interactions ==
Retinoic acid receptor beta has been shown to interact with NR4A2.

== Ligands ==
Agonists

- Adapalene (also agonist at RARγ)
- BMS641 and related compounds such as BMS948 and BMS411
- CD2314
- KCL-286
- Tazarotene (mixed RARβ/RARγ agonist, selective over RARα)
- Tretinoin (non selective, acts at all RAR subtypes as well as RXR)

Antagonists

- LE135
- LE540

== See also ==
- Retinoic acid receptor
