= Ulobetasol propionate =

Pharmaceutical drug

Clinical data
- Trade names: Ultravate, Lexette, Bryhali
- Other names: Halobetasol propionate, halobetasol propionate (USAN US)
- AHFS/Drugs.com: Professional Drug Facts
- MedlinePlus: a601060
- Routes of administration: Topical
- Drug class: Corticosteroid; Glucocorticoid
- ATC code: D07AC21 (WHO)

Legal status
- Legal status: CA: ℞-only; US: ℞-only

Identifiers
- IUPAC name: [(6S,8S,9R,10S,11S,13S,14S,16S,17R)-17-(2-Chloroacetyl)-6,9-difluoro-11-hydroxy-10,13,16-trimethyl-3-oxo-6,7,8,11,12,14,15,16-octahydrocyclopenta[a]phenanthren-17-yl] propanoate
- CAS Number: 66852-54-8
- PubChem CID: 6918178
- DrugBank: DB00596
- UNII: 91A0K1TY3Z
- ChEMBL: ChEMBL1200908; ChEMBL1876307
- CompTox Dashboard (EPA): DTXSID6046636
- ECHA InfoCard: 100.211.977

Chemical and physical data
- Formula: C_{25}H_{31}ClF_{2}O_{5}
- Molar mass: 484.96 g·mol^{−1}
- 3D model (JSmol): Interactive image
- SMILES: CCC(=O)O[C@@]1([C@H](C[C@@H]2[C@@]1(C[C@@H]([C@]3([C@H]2C[C@@H](C4=CC(=O)C=C[C@@]43C)F)F)O)C)C)C(=O)CCl
- InChI: InChI=1S/C25H31ClF2O5/c1-5-21(32)33-25(20(31)12-26)13(2)8-15-16-10-18(27)17-9-14(29)6-7-22(17,3)24(16,28)19(30)11-23(15,25)4/h6-7,9,13,15-16,18-19,30H,5,8,10-12H2,1-4H3/t13-,15-,16-,18-,19-,22-,23-,24-,25-/m0/s1; Key:BDSYKGHYMJNPAB-LICBFIPMSA-N

Ulobetasol propionate, also known as halobetasol propionate and sold under the brand name Ultravate among others, is a synthetic glucocorticoid corticosteroid and a corticosteroid ester.

It was patented in 1975 and approved for medical use in 1990.
