= Eclabium =

Lip deformity

Eclabium means the turning outwards of the lip. Eclabium comes from the Greek word "ek" meaning "out," and the Latin word "labium" meaning "lip." This deformation occurs in most babies born with harlequin type ichthyosis, caused by genetic defects. Eclabium can severely impact the quality of life. There are ways to predict if a child will have this condition before they are born through genetic testing. For patients who develop eclabium due to improper wound healing, there are different treatment options available to restore the lips back to normal or at least to the point where they are not a hazard to the patients quality of life. Periodontitis can also cause eclabium. As eclabium is a symptom, it is treated by addressing its cause. When the underlying disease is treated, the eclabium tends to go away as well.

== Classification ==
It is commonly classified as a congenital malformation (birth defect) however it can also result from improper healing of a wound.

== Causes ==
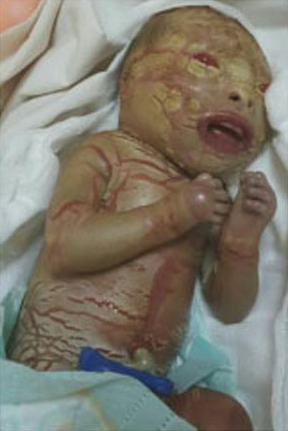
Harlequin ichthyosis

Causes of eclabium include but are not limited to

- General Ichthyosis.
- Congenital ichthyosis
- Lamellar ichthyosis
- Harlequin type Ichthyosis
- Scarring after trauma, such as surgery
- Gingivitis/periodontitis
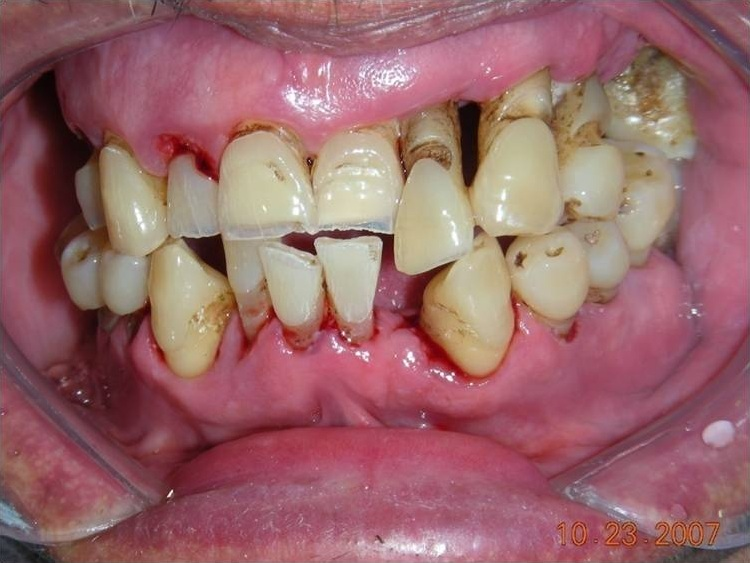
  Periodontitis

=== Mechanisms ===
Disease causing variants in adenosine triphosphate binding cassette transporter protein (A12 gene) on chromosome 2 carries information for lipid transportation to keratinocytes in the cutaneous layer. The malfunction of this gene causes scaly tight skin. The tightening of the skin pulls the eyes and lips back causing eclabium and ectropion. This disease has a Rare autosomal recessive mode of inheritance.

At times the skin does not heal properly after surgery or a wound. Improper healing of a wound on or near the lips can cause eclabium. All wounds heal in 3 parts: contraction, connective tissue matrix deposition and epithelialization. If any one of those parts is disrupted, it can become a cause of eclabium

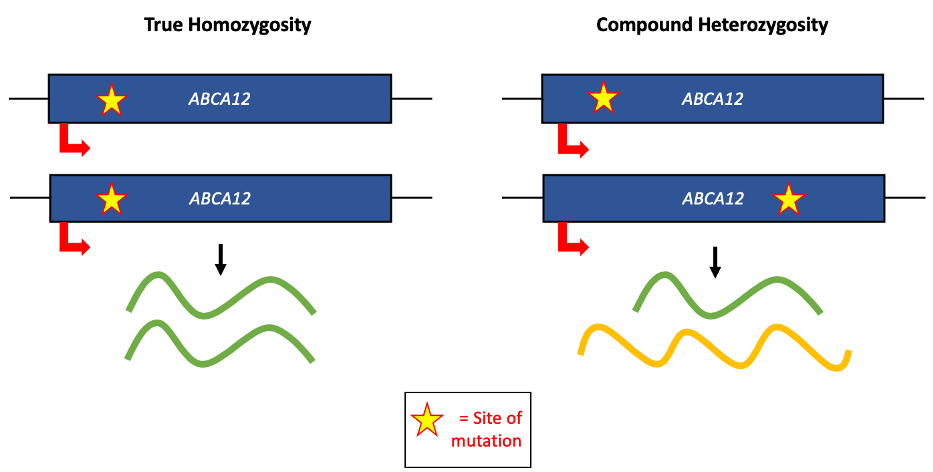
True homozygous versus compound heterozygous for the ABCA 12 gene.

== Signs and symptoms ==
Diseases that cause eclabium have the following signs and symptoms

- Tight scaly skin (Ichthyosis)
- Absence of ABCA12 gene (Ichthyosis)
- Swollen or puffy gums (Periodontitis/Gingivitis)
- Purulent drainage from lips (Improper Wound healing)
- Wide mouth which causes difficulty feeding and suckling
- Difficulty in feeding causes lack of adequate nutrition, dehydration and even death
- Skin that is more prone to infection
- Hindered pulmonary ventilation Hindered pulmonary ventilation

== Diagnosis ==
Eclabium is very clearly visible and a medical professional can identify it easily. In some cases it can be diagnosed beforehand. For example, when there has been a surgery by the lip or gums, abnormal healing can be very likely. When the tissue does not heal properly it can result in the outward turning of the lip.

Also, If a mother tests positive for a mutation in the ABCA12 gene, eclabium as a result of Ichthyosis can be present in the child. Ichthyosis is characterized by tight scaly skin along with ectropion which is outward turning of eyelids. If the skin is tight enough to be pulling on the eyes then it is safe to diagnose that the tight skin is also pulling on the lips making them turn outward

If a patient is diagnosed with periodontitis it can cause swelling of the gums which in turn causes the outward turning of the lip.

== Prevention ==
To prevent eclabium, testing for the mutation for ABCA12 gene can be done on the mother to see if the unborn child has the gene. This allows the parents to make a decision accordingly because most children with ABCA12 gene mutation will have eclabium.

Healing of wounds near lips or gums should be carefully monitored to prevent severe eclabium. If the improper healing is caught at the right time it can become imperative to prevent the eclabium as soon as possible.

Basic dental hygiene can help prevent periodontitis. Basic dental hygiene includes brushing and flossing as well as regular dentist visits. If periodontitis is prevented, it reduces the chances of eclabium caused by poor dental hygiene.

== Treatment ==
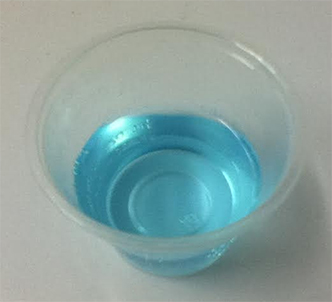
Chlorhexidine for treating Periodontitis

To reduce the tightness and dehydration of the skin, Lubricant ointment has been used. When the skin becomes less tense, it doesn't pull at the lips as much causing a reduction in the eclabium. Once the skin is loose enough the eclabium subsides. Eclabium can be a lifelong disorder, but drug treatment for the causing disease would heal the lips as well. For example for harlequin ichthyosis drugs such as Tazarotene and isotretinoin have been used to help the skin heal and loosen up which helps the eclabium heal. But sometimes surgery might become necessary to correct the disorder. Lateral columella base-labrum transposition flap results in soft linear scars without hyperplasia. It is an easy, minimally invasive and nearly no secondary malformation method. a type of flap used is the Limberg/Rhomboid flap. The flap is made up of Cutaneous tissue to close defects anywhere on the body.

If the eclabium is caused by periodontitis, treatment includes removal of plaque and calculus from the teeth, antimicrobial mouth rinse such as chlorhexidine, antiseptic chips/gels. When the swelling in the gums reduces it will no longer push on lips making them turn outwards.

== Prognosis and Epidemiology ==
Unfortunately, most conditions that cause eclabium, such as ichthyosis, have a very high mortality rate with worldwide figure approaching 50 percent. However, eclabium caused by improper wound healing is usually reversible through another corrective surgery and has little to no mortality.

Scarring can occur from surgery to correct eclabium. Some patients might get further cosmetic surgery to fix the scarring.

Eclabium caused by Periodontitis is almost always treatable and if it has advanced severely, surgery can help to treat it. It does not cause death but it can become very painful and decrease the quality of life if left untreated. It can affect anyone who does not follow good oral hygiene. It currently affects 20-50% of the global population but only a small portion of cases become severe enough to cause eclabium.

Eclabium caused by harlequin ichthyosis is more severe. Its prognosis is very poor. Most affected babies do not survive the first week of life. Survival rates based on the severity of the case have varied from 10 months to 25 years with supportive treatment. The oldest person in the united states with Harlequin Ichthyosis is 23 year old Stephanie Turner. She was also the first person to have a child with this condition. She has two children and neither have the condition. There is a 25% chance of this condition reoccurring in the mothers next pregnancy. Genetic counseling is highly recommended for couples who have the mutated ABCA12 gene.

== Research ==
A research study conducted in 2019 on a pregnant couple with a child that has Harlequin Ichthyosis talked about characteristic sonographic features. Eclabium and ectropion can be seen in the ultrasound. The mouth is persistently open and restriction of limb movement is also seen.

Another Research was inducted on the use of retinoids and whether or not they are the only way to treat Harlequin Ichthyosis. The research titled survival without systemic retinoids mentions how the chances of survival are very low regardless of retinoid treatment. According to this study two neonates were able to survive with intensive care but no retinoids.

Further research on the types of Ichthyosis and receiving genetic counseling for the condition is still being reviewed. The importance of neonatologist, a pediatric dermatologist, a geneticist and other specialists is discussed in this study. Their involvement can help better the treatment plan for Harlequin Ichthyosis patients and help ease symptoms such as eclabium.
