= Isotretinoin =

Medication primarily used to treat severe acne

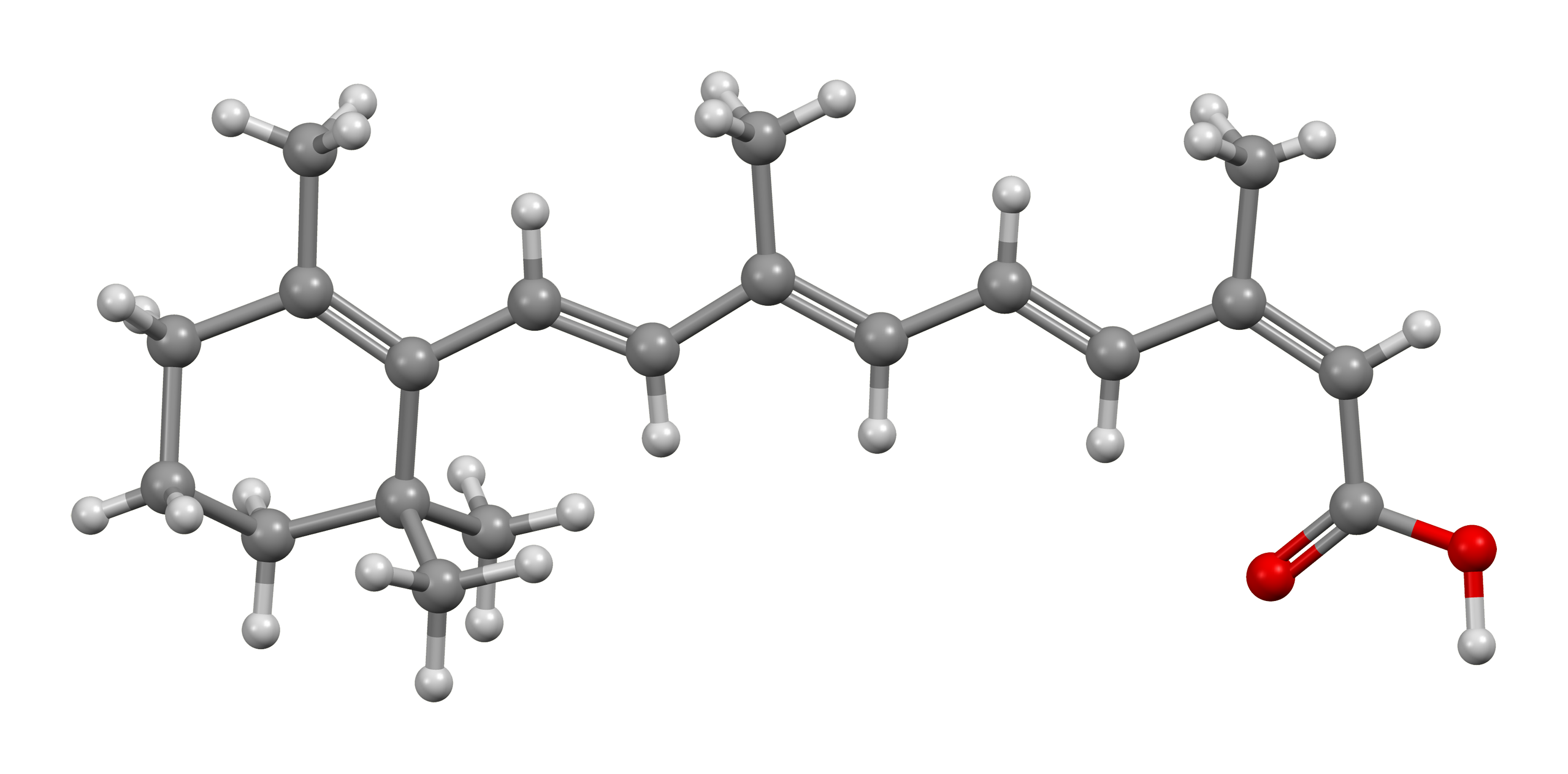

Clinical data
- Pronunciation: See note at tretinoin
- Trade names: Accutane, Roaccutane, others
- AHFS/Drugs.com: Monograph
- MedlinePlus: a681043
- License data: US DailyMed: Isotretinoin
- Pregnancy category: AU: X (High risk)
- Routes of administration: By mouth, topical
- ATC code: D10AD04 (WHO)

Legal status
- Legal status: AU: S4 (Prescription only); BR: Class C2 (Retinoids); CA: ℞-only; UK: POM (Prescription only); US: ℞-only; EU: Rx-only; In general: ℞ (Prescription only)

Pharmacokinetic data
- Bioavailability: Variable
- Protein binding: 99.9%
- Metabolism: Liver
- Elimination half-life: 10–20 hours
- Excretion: Kidney and feces

Identifiers
- IUPAC name: (2Z,4E,6E,8E)-3,7-Dimethyl-9-(2,6,6-trimethylcyclohex-1-en-1-yl)nona-2,4,6,8-tetraenoic acid
- CAS Number: 4759-48-2
- PubChem CID: 5282379
- IUPHAR/BPS: 7600
- DrugBank: DB00982
- ChemSpider: 4445539
- UNII: EH28UP18IF
- KEGG: D00348
- ChEBI: CHEBI:6067
- ChEMBL: ChEMBL547
- CompTox Dashboard (EPA): DTXSID4023177
- ECHA InfoCard: 100.022.996

Chemical and physical data
- Formula: C_{20}H_{28}O_{2}
- Molar mass: 300.442 g·mol^{−1}
- 3D model (JSmol): Interactive image
- SMILES: O=C(O)\C=C(/C=C/C=C(/C=C/C1=C(/CCCC1(C)C)C)C)C
- InChI: InChI=1S/C20H28O2/c1-15(8-6-9-16(2)14-19(21)22)11-12-18-17(3)10-7-13-20(18,4)5/h6,8-9,11-12,14H,7,10,13H2,1-5H3,(H,21,22)/b9-6+,12-11+,15-8+,16-14-; Key:SHGAZHPCJJPHSC-XFYACQKRSA-N

Isotretinoin, also known as 13-cis-retinoic acid and sold under the brand name Accutane among others, is a medication used to treat skin diseases like harlequin-type ichthyosis, lamellar ichthyosis, and severe cystic acne or moderate acne that is unresponsive to antibiotics. Isotretinoin is used off-label to treat basal cell carcinoma and squamous cell carcinoma, although clinical evidence suggests it is not effective in this setting. It is a retinoid, meaning it is related to vitamin A, and is found in small quantities naturally in the body. Its isomer, tretinoin, is also an acne drug. In its pure form, isotretinoin is an orange powder.

The most common adverse effects are dry lips (cheilitis), dry and fragile skin (xeroderma), dry eyes and an increased susceptibility to sunburn. Uncommon and rare side effects include muscle aches and pains (myalgias), headaches, and depression in some users. Some of those side effects can persist long after the discontinuation of the use of the drug. Isotretinoin may cause liver failure, therefore the patient's blood levels should be regularly tested. It is known to cause birth defects due to in-utero exposure because of the molecule's close resemblance to retinoic acid, a natural vitamin A derivative that controls normal embryonic development. It is associated with psychiatric side effects, most commonly depression, and more rarely, psychosis and unusual behaviors. Other rare side effects include hyperostosis and premature epiphyseal closure, which have been reported to be persistent.

Isotretinoin was patented in 1969 and approved for medical use in 1982. In 2021, it was the 264th most commonly prescribed medication in the United States, with more than 1 million prescriptions.

== Medical uses ==
Isotretinoin is used primarily for persistent cystic acne. Many dermatologists also support its use for treatment of lesser degrees of acne that prove resistant to other treatments, or that produce scarring or psychological distress. Isotretinoin is not indicated for the treatment of prepubertal acne and is not recommended in children less than 12 years of age.

It is also somewhat effective for hidradenitis suppurativa and some cases of severe rosacea. It can also be used to help treat harlequin ichthyosis, lamellar ichthyosis and is used in xeroderma pigmentosum cases to relieve keratoses. Isotretinoin has been used to treat the extremely rare condition fibrodysplasia ossificans progressiva. It is also used for the treatment of pediatric neuroblastoma in Japan, but data for its efficacy is not conclusive and it has not been approved in other countries.

Isotretinoin therapy has furthermore proven effective against genital warts in experimental use but is rarely used for this indication as there are more effective treatments. Isotretinoin may represent an efficacious and safe alternative systemic form of therapy for recalcitrant condylomata acuminata (RCA) of the cervix. In most countries, this therapy is currently unapproved and only used if other therapies fail.

=== Prescribing restrictions ===
Isotretinoin is a teratogen; there is about a 20–35% risk for congenital defects in infants exposed to the drug in utero, and about 30–60% of children exposed to isotretinoin prenatally have been reported to show neurocognitive impairment. Because of this risk, there are strict controls prescribing isotretinoin to women who have potential to become (or be) pregnant while taking isotretinoin and many are strongly advised to terminate their pregnancies because of the 20-60% risk. Isotretinoin is also not recommended for use by breastfeeding women.

In the United States, since March 2006, the dispensing of isotretinoin is run through the iPLEDGE program, under the direction of the Food and Drug Administration. Prescribers, pharmacists, and all people to whom the drug is prescribed need to register on the site and log information into it. Women with child-bearing potential must commit to using two forms of effective contraception simultaneously for the duration of isotretinoin therapy and for a month immediately preceding and a month immediately following therapy. Additionally, they must have two negative pregnancy tests 30 days apart and have negative pregnancy tests before each prescription is written.

In most countries, isotretinoin can only be prescribed by dermatologists or specialist physicians; some countries also allow limited prescriptions by general practitioners and family doctors. In the United Kingdom and Australia, isotretinoin may be prescribed only by or under the supervision of a consultant dermatologist. Because severe cystic acne has the potential to cause permanent scarring over a short period, restrictions on its more immediate availability have proved contentious. In New Zealand, isotretinoin can be prescribed by any doctor but subsidized only when prescribed by a vocationally-registered general practitioner, dermatologist or nurse practitioner.

== Adverse effects ==
Increasingly higher dosages will result in higher toxicity, resembling vitamin A toxicity. Adverse effects include:

	According to information leaflets					According to studies
Type of disorders	Very common (≥ 1/10)	Common (≥ 1/100, < 1/10)	Rare (≥ 1/10000,< 1/1000)	Very rare (≤ 1/10000)	Unknown Frequency	Frequency
Infections				Gram-positive (mucocutaneous) bacterial infection		
Blood and lymphatic system	Anemia; Increased red blood cell sedimentation rate; Thrombocytopenia; Thrombocytosis	Neutropenia		Lymphadenopathy		
Immune system			Allergic skin reaction; Anaphylactic reactions; Hypersensitivity			
Metabolism				Diabetes mellitus; Hyperuricaemia		
Psychiatric			Depression; Aggravated depression; Aggressive tendencies; Anxiety; Mood alterations	Abnormal behaviour; Psychotic disorder; Suicidal ideation; Suicide attempt; Suicide		Psychiatric: 25.15%
Nervous system		Headache		Idiopathic intracranial hypertension; Convulsions; Drowsiness; Dizziness		
Eye	Blepharitis; Conjunctivitis; Dry eyes; Eye irritation			Blurred vision; Cataract; Colour blindness; Contact lens intolerance; Corneal opacity; Decreased night vision; Keratitis; Papilloedema; Photophobia; Visual disturbances		
Ear				Impaired hearing		
Vascular				Vasculitis (i.e. Granulomatosis with polyangiitis, allergic vasculitis)		
Respiratory, thoracic and mediastinal		Epistaxis; Nasal dryness; Nasopharyngitis		Bronchospasm (particularly in people with asthma); Hoarseness		
Gastrointestinal				Colitis; Ileitis; Dry throat; Gastrointestinal haemorrhage; Haemorrhagic diarrhoea; Inflammatory bowel disease; Nausea; Pancreatitis		
Hepatobiliary	Increased transaminase			Hepatitis		
Skin and subcutaneous tissues	Cheilitis; Dermatitis; Dry skin; Localised exfoliation; Pruritus; Rash erythematous; Skin fragility (with a risk of frictional trauma); Paronychia		Alopecia- hair shedding from telogen effluvium	Acne fulminans; Aggravated acne (acne flare); Erythema (facial); Exanthema; Hair disorders; Hirsutism; Nail dystrophy; Paronychia; Photosensitivity reaction; Pili torti; Pyogenic granuloma; Skin hyperpigmentation; Increased sweating	Erythema multiforme; Stevens-Johnson Syndrome; Toxic epidermal necrolysis.	100%
Musculo-skeletal and connective tissue	Arthralgia; Myalgia; Back pain			Arthritis; Calcinosis (calcification of ligaments; and tendons): Premature epiphyseal fusion; Exostosis; Hyperostosis; Osteopenia; Tendonitis	Rhabdomyolysis	
Kidney and urinary				Glomerulonephritis	Dark or cola-coloured urine	
Reproductive system and breast disorders					Sexual dysfunction, including erectile dysfunction and decreased libido	
General				Increased formation of granulation tissue; Malaise		
Investigation	Increased triglycerides; Decreased HDL	Increased blood cholesterol; Increased blood glucose; Haematuria; Proteinuria		Increased creatine phosphokinase		

=== Possible permanent effects ===
The adverse effects of isotretinoin may be permanent. This has been proposed to be due to induction of apoptosis (programmed cell death) in sebaceous glands, meibomian glands, neuroblastoma cells, hypothalamic cells, hippocampus cells, Dalton's lymphoma ascites cells, B16F-10 melanoma cells, neuronal crest cells, stem cells and others. Other studies have shown that isotretinoin changes intestinal cell epigenetics in mice and shortens telomeres in human bone marrow cell cultures.

Isotretinoin may stop long bone growth in young people who are still growing. Premature epiphyseal closure can occur in people receiving recommended doses of Accutane.

Isotretinoin is known to cause meibomian gland dysfunction which causes persistent keratoconjunctivitis sicca (dry eye). Problems with the meibomian and salivary glands are likely due to the non-selective apoptosis of the cells of the exocrine glands. Decreased night vision has been reported to persist in some people after discontinuation of isotretinoin therapy, although most cases of decreased night vision appear to resolve after discontinuing the medication.

=== Sexual ===
Isotretinoin is also associated with permanent sexual side effects, namely erectile dysfunction and reduced libido. In October 2017, the UK MHRA issued a Drug Safety Update to physicians in response to reports of these problems. This was in response to an EU review, published in August 2017, which states that a plausible physiological explanation of these side effects "may be a reduction in plasma testosterone". The review also stated that "the product information should be updated to include 'sexual dysfunction including erectile dysfunction and decreased libido' as an undesirable effect with an unknown frequency". There have also been reports of spermatogenesis disorders, such as oligospermia. 27 cases of sexual dysfunction report either negative dechallenge or positive dechallenge.

=== Skin ===
The most common side effects are mucocutaneous: dry lips, skin, and nose. Other common mucocutaneous side effects are inflammation and chapping of the lips (cheilitis), redness of the skin (erythema), rashes, peeling, eczema (dermatitis), itching (pruritus) and nose bleeds (epistaxis). Absence of dryness of the lips is considered an indication of non-compliance with treatment (not taking the drug as advised), as it occurs in almost all people who take it.

Regular use of lip balm and moisturizer is recommended throughout treatment to reduce these problems. The dose may need to be decreased to reduce the severity of these side effects. The skin becomes more fragile—especially to frictional forces—and may not heal as quickly as normal. Wound healing is delayed. For this reason, elective surgery, waxing of hair, tattooing, tattoo removal, piercings, dermabrasion, exfoliation, etc., are not recommended during treatment. Treatment of acne scars is generally deferred until 12 months after completion of a course of isotretinoin.

=== Teratogenicity ===
Isotretinoin is a teratogen highly likely to cause birth defects if taken by women during pregnancy or even a short time before conception. A few of the more common birth defects this drug can cause are hearing and visual impairment, missing or malformed earlobes, facial dysmorphism, and abnormalities in brain function. Isotretinoin is classified as FDA Pregnancy Category X and ADEC Category X, and use is contraindicated in pregnancy. In the EU, isotretinoin (oral) is contraindicated in pregnancy and must not be taken by women able to have children unless the conditions of a pregnancy prevention program are met.

The manufacturer recommends pregnancy be ruled out two weeks before commencement of isotretinoin, and women should use two simultaneous forms of effective contraception at least one month before commencement, during, and for at least one month following isotretinoin therapy.

In the US, around 2000 women became pregnant while taking the drug between 1982 and 2000, with most pregnancies ending in abortion or miscarriage. About 160 babies with birth defects were born. After the FDA put the more strict iPLEDGE program in place for the companies marketing the drug in the US, in 2011, 155 pregnancies occurred (0.12%) among 129,544 women of childbearing potential taking isotretinoin.

People taking isotretinoin are advised against donating blood during and for at least one month after treatment due to its teratogenicity.

=== Psychological effects ===
Psychological side effects may include depression, worsening of pre-existing depression, aggressive tendencies, irritable mood, and anxiety. Very rare effects include abnormal behaviour, psychosis, suicidal ideation, suicide attempts, and suicide. In a total of 5577 adverse reactions reported to the UK's MHRA up to 31 March 2017, the plurality (1207, or 22%) concerned psychiatric effects. There were 85 reports of suicidal ideation, 56 of suicide and 43 of suicide attempts.

A 2005 study initially found that isotretinoin decreases the brain metabolism in the orbitofrontal cortex by an average of 21%, a brain area known to mediate symptoms of depression. However, a subsequent re-analysis that examined whole‑brain metabolism before and after treatment did not find a statistically significant difference.

The association between isotretinoin use and psychopathology has been controversial. Beginning in 1983, isolated case reports emerged suggesting mood change, particularly depression, occurring during or soon after isotretinoin use. Several studies have been conducted since then of the drug's effect on depression, psychosis, suicidal thoughts and other psychological effects.

==== Depression and suicidality ====
Isotretinoin is the only non-psychiatric drug on the FDA's top 10 list of drugs associated with depression and is also within the top 10 for suicide attempts. A black box warning for suicide, depression, and psychosis has been present on isotretinoin's packaging in the United States since 2005. In March 2018, European Medicines Agency issued a warning on a possible risk of neuropsychiatric disorders (such as depression, anxiety, and mood changes) following the use of oral retinoids, including isotretinoin, though the limitations of the available data did not allow them to establish whether this risk was due to the use of retinoids.

A Swedish retrospective cohort study with 5756 patients showed a significantly increased risk of attempted suicides from 6 months after the treatment to around 2 years after the treatment.

In 2012, a systematic review covering all articles in the literature related to isotretinoin, depression, and suicide, as well as articles related to class effect, dose-response, and biological plausibility found that the literature reviewed was consistent with an association of isotretinoin administration and depression and with suicide in a subgroup of vulnerable individuals. Following this systematic review, in a 2014 review a group of Australian dermatologists and psychiatrists collaborated on a set of recommendations for safe prescribing of isotretinoin. However, whether isotretinoin use is causally associated with mental illness remains controversial.

Evidence for depression being causally associated with isotretinoin use includes 41 reports of positive challenge/dechallenge/rechallenge with isotretinoin, involving administering isotretinoin, withdrawing the drug, and then re-administering it. The majority of these cases had no psychiatric history. There is also a temporal relationship between the development of depression and initiation of isotretinoin treatment, with most cases developing after 1–2 months of treatment. Further, higher doses of isotretinoin increase the risk of developing depression, with 25% of people showing depression on a dose of 3 mg/kg/day as compared with 3–4% at normal doses. Studies have uncovered several biological processes which may credibly explain the affective changes induced by isotretinoin.

==== Psychosis ====
Isotretinoin has also been linked to psychosis. Many of the side effects of isotretinoin mimic hypervitaminosis A, which has been associated with psychotic symptoms. The dopamine hypothesis of schizophrenia and psychosis suggests that an increase in dopaminergic stimulation or sensitivity in the limbic system causes psychotic symptoms.

It has been suggested that dysregulation of retinoid receptors by retinoids such as isotretinoin may cause schizophrenia. The evidence for this is threefold: transcriptional activation of the dopamine D2 receptor – in addition to serotonin and glutamate receptors – is regulated by retinoic acid; schizophrenia and the retinoid cascade have been linked to the same gene loci; and retinoid dysfunction causes congenital anomalies identical to those observed in people with schizophrenia. Further, the expression of dopamine receptors has indeed been shown to be regulated by retinoic acid.

=== Musculoskeletal ===
Isotretinoin has a number of muscoloskeletal effects. Myalgia (muscular pain) and arthralgia (joint pain) are common side effects. Retinoids, such as high dose etretinate, are well known to cause bone changes, the most common type of which is hyperostotic changes (excessive bone growth), especially in growing children and adolescents. While excessive bone growth has been raised as a possible side effect of isotretinoin, a 2006 review found little evidence for this. Other problems include premature epiphyseal closure and calcification of tendons and ligaments. The bones of the spine and feet are most commonly affected. Risk factors for skeletal effects include older age, greater dosage, and longer course of treatment. Most bone changes cause no symptoms and may only be noticed using X-ray imaging.

=== Gastrointestinal ===
Isotretinoin may cause non-specific gastrointestinal symptoms including nausea, diarrhea, and abdominal pain. The drug is associated with inflammatory bowel disease (IBD)—ulcerative colitis, but not Crohn's disease. There are also reports of people developing irritable bowel syndrome (IBS) and worsening of existing IBS.

=== Eyes ===
Isotretinoin and other retinoids are well known to affect the eyes. Dry eyes are very common during treatment and is caused by isotretinoin's apoptotic effect on the meibomian glands. Some people develop contact lens intolerance as a result. In some people, these changes are long-lasting or irreversible and represent Meibomian Gland Dysfunction (MGD). Other common effects on the eyes include inflammation of the eyelid (blepharitis), red eye caused by conjunctivitis and irritation of the eye. More rare ocular side effects include blurred vision, decreased night vision (which may be permanent), colour blindness, development of corneal opacities, inflammation of the cornea (keratitis), swelling of the optic disk (papilloedema, associated with IIH), photophobia and other visual disturbances.

== Pharmacology ==
=== Mechanism of action ===
Isotretinoin's exact mechanism of action is unknown, but several studies have shown that isotretinoin induces apoptosis (programmatic cell death) in various cells in the body. Cell death may be instigated in the meibomian glands, hypothalamic cells, hippocampus cells and—important for treatment of acne—in sebaceous gland cells. Isotretinoin has a low affinity for retinoic acid receptors (RAR) and retinoid X receptors (RXR), but may be converted intracellularly to metabolites that act as agonists of RAR and RXR nuclear receptors.

One study suggests the drug amplifies production of neutrophil gelatinase-associated lipocalin (NGAL) in the skin, which has been shown to reduce sebum production by inducing apoptosis in sebaceous gland cells, while exhibiting an antimicrobial effect on Cutibacterium acnes. The drug decreases the size and sebum output of the sebaceous glands. Isotretinoin is the only available acne drug that affects all four major pathogenic processes in acne, which distinguishes it from alternative treatments (such as antibiotics) and accounts for its efficacy in severe, nodulocystic cases. The effect of isotretinoin on sebum production can be temporary, or remission of the disease can be "complete and prolonged."

Isotretinoin has been speculated to down-regulate the enzyme telomerase and hTERT, inhibiting "cellular immortalization and tumorigenesis." In a 2007 study, isotretinoin was proven to inhibit the action of the metalloprotease MMP-9 (gelatinase) in sebum without any influence in the action of TIMP1 and TIMP2 (the tissue inhibitors of metalloproteases). It is already known that metalloproteases play an important role in the pathogenesis of acne.

==== CNS activities ====
A possible biological basis for the case reports of depression involves decreased metabolism in the orbitofrontal cortex (OFC) of the frontal lobe. It has also been found that decreased OFC metabolism was correlated with headaches. People reporting headache as a side effect often report comorbid neuropsychiatric symptoms, especially depression; a statistically significant relationship between headache and depression has been established. It is suggested that people sensitive to isotretinoin-induced CNS effects may also be susceptible to other psychiatric side effects such as depression.

Studies in mice and rats have found that retinoids, including isotretinoin, bind to dopaminergic receptors in the central nervous system. Isotretinoin may affect dopaminergic neurotransmission by disrupting the structure of dopamine receptors and decreasing dopaminergic activity. The dopaminergic system is implicated in numerous psychological disorders, including depression. Isotretinoin is also thought to affect the serotonergic system – it increases expression of 5-HT_{1A} receptors in the pre-synaptic neuron, which inhibit serotonin secretion. Isotretinoin also, directly and indirectly, increases the translation of the serotonin transporter protein (SERT), leading to increased reuptake and consequently reduced synaptic availability of serotonin.

Inhibition of hippocampal neurogenesis may also play a role in the development of isotretinoin-induced depression. A further effect of isotretinoin on the brain involves retinoic acid function in the hypothalamus, the hormone regulatory centre of the brain and part of the hypothalamus-pituitary-adrenal axis, a key part of the body's stress response. Other brain regions regulated by retinoic acid and potentially disrupted by isotretinoin include the frontal cortex and the striatum.

=== Pharmacokinetics and pharmacodynamics ===
Oral isotretinoin is best absorbed when taken with a high-fat meal because it has a high level of lipophilicity. The efficacy of isotretinoin doubles when taken after a high-fat meal compared to when taken without food. Due to isotretinoin's molecular relationship to vitamin A, it should not be taken with vitamin A supplements due to the danger of toxicity through cumulative overdosing. Accutane also negatively interacts with tetracycline, another class of acne drug, and with micro-dosed ('mini-pill') progesterone preparations, norethisterone/ethinylestradiol ('OrthoNovum 7/7/7'), St. John's Wort, phenytoin, and systemic corticosteroids.

Isotretinoin is primarily (99.9%) bound to plasma proteins, mostly albumin. Three metabolites of isotretinoin are detectable in human plasma after oral administration: 4-oxo-isotretinoin, retinoid acid (tretinoin), and 4-oxo-retinoic acid (4-oxo-tretinoin). Isotretinoin also oxidizes, irreversibly, to 4-oxo-isotretinoin—which forms its geometric isomer 4-oxo-tretinoin. After an orally administered 80 mg dose of liquid suspension ^{14}C-isotretinoin, ^{14}C-activity in blood declines with a half-life of 90 hours. The metabolites of isotretinoin and its conjugates are then excreted in the subject's urine and faeces in relatively equal amounts. After a single, 80 mg oral dose of Isotretinoin to 74 healthy adult subjects under fed conditions, the mean ±SD elimination half-life (t_{1/2}) of isotretinoin and 4-oxo-isotretinoin were 21.0 ± 8.2 hours and 24.0 ± 5.3 hours, respectively. After both single and multiple doses, the observed accumulation ratios of isotretinoin ranged from 0.90 to 5.43 in people with cystic acne.

== History ==
In the 1960s, Werner Bollag of Roche Laboratories began studying 13-cis retinoic acid as a treatment for skin cancer. By 1971, Roche showed that the compound was likely ineffective against cancer but useful for treating acne. However, Roche abandoned the product after finding a likelihood that the compound could cause birth defects, as the thalidomide scandal had raised the public's fear of such side effects. In 1975, Gary Peck, a dermatologist at the National Cancer Institute, initiated a collaboration with Hoffmann-La Roche to evaluate the efficacy of isotretinoin for a number of dermatological conditions previously managed with retinoic acids, including acne, psoriasis, genetic skin disorders, and skin cancer prevention. After Peck authored an article in 1979 reporting the drug's effectiveness against cystic and conglobate acne, Roche submitted a New Drug Application to the Food and Drug Administration (FDA). While admitting that isotretinoin caused birth defects in rabbits, Roche avoided regulatory scrutiny by excluding pregnant women from its clinical trials and secured FDA approval in 1982.

Despite prior correlation of isotretinoin with birth defects, Accutane quickly became the dominant acne treatment prescribed by dermatologists and general practitioners alike. In 1983, the FDA made the unprecedented decision to warn blood banks against accepting the blood of donors taking isotretinoin and instruct women to begin taking contraceptives one month before use. In 1985, the FDA further required a boxed warning to be added, but the problem grew with an estimated 1000 birth defects attributed to the drug by early 1988. While an advisory committee of pediatricians and Centers for Disease Control and Prevention (CDC) staff advised the FDA to restrict Accutane prescriptions, the FDA instead required Roche to expand its warnings of potential side effects and provide informed consent forms to doctors.

In 2000, the CDC reported that Roche's Pregnancy Prevention Program of providing contraception counseling and pregnancy testing for women prescribed Accutane was ineffective. The revamped "Targeted Pregnancy Prevention Program" advised women to use two kinds of contraceptives and two pregnancy tests while requiring doctors to directly provide prescriptions to pharmacists to limit off-label use. After Representative Bart Stupak's son committed suicide while taking Accutane in May 2000, Congress held hearings in which some dermatologists attested to Accutane's efficacy in reducing acne and its associated stigma, while others petitioned the FDA for further restrictions of its use. In 2001, the FDA announced the System to Manage Accutane Related Teratogenicity (SMART), which required Roche to train doctors for a sticker-based system of verifying that female patients took pregnancy tests before using Accutane. SMART was replaced by the iPLEDGE program in March 2006.

In February 2002, Roche's patents for isotretinoin expired, allowing generic drugs to enter the market. By June 2009, Roche discontinued the Accutane brand amid falling market share and rising costs from personal injury lawsuits. However, Roche's overseas affiliates continue to sell isotretinoin as Roaccutane. In 2011, actor James Marshall sued Roche, alleging that Accutane had caused injuries requiring removal of his colon, but the jury denied his claim based on Marshall's pre-existing bowel disease.

== Brands ==
As of 2017, isotretinoin was marketed under many brand names worldwide: A-Cnotren, Absorica, Accuran, Accutane, Accutin, Acne Free, Acnecutan, Acnegen, Acnemin, Acneone, Acneral, Acnestar, Acnetane, Acnetin A, Acnetrait, Acnetrex, Acnogen, Acnotin, Acnotren, Acretin, Actaven, Acugen, Acutret, Acutrex, Ai Si Jie, Aisoskin, Aknal, Aknefug Iso, Aknenormin, Aknesil, Aknetrent, Amnesteem, Atlacne, Atretin, Axotret, Casius, Ciscutan, Claravis, Contracné, Curacne, Curacné, Curakne, Curatane, Cuticilin, Decutan, Dercutane, Effederm, Epuris, Eudyna, Farmacne, Flexresan, Flitrion, I-Ret, Inerta, Inflader, Inotrin, Isac, Isdiben, Isoacne, Isobest, Isocural, Isoderm, Isoface, IsoGalen, Isogeril, Isolve, Isoprotil, Isoriac, Isosupra, Isosupra Lidose, Isotane, Isotina, Isotinon, Isotren, Isotret, Isotretinoin, Isotretinoina, Isotretinoína, Isotretinoine, Isotretinoïne, Isotrétinoïne, Isotretinoinum, Isotrex, Isotrin, Isotroin, Ivory, Izotek, Izotziaja, Lisacne, Locatret, Mayesta, Medinac, Myorisan, Neotrex, Netlook, Nimegen, Noitron, Noroseptan, Novacne, Oralne, Oraret, Oratane, Piplex, Policano, Procuta, Reducar, Retacnyl, Retin A, Roaccutan, Roaccutane, Roacnetan, Roacta, Roacutan, Rocne, Rocta, Sotret, Stiefotrex, Tai Er Si, Teweisi, Tretin, Tretinac, Tretinex, Tretiva, Tufacne, Zenatane, Zerocutan, Zonatian ME, and Zoretanin.

The topical combination drug erythromycin/isotretinoin combines the antibiotic erythromycin with isotretinoin and has been marketed under the brand names Isotrex Eritromicina, Isotrexin, and Munderm.
