= Harlequin-type ichthyosis =

Genetic skin disease

- Other names: Harlequin ichthyosis, ichthyosis fetalis, keratosis diffusa fetalis, harlequin fetus, ichthyosis congenita gravior
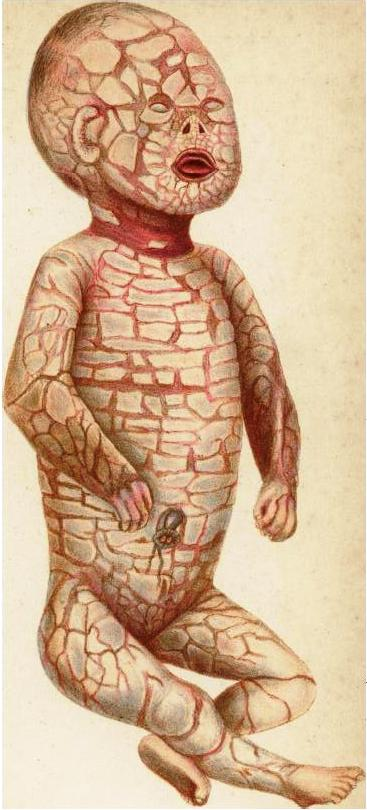
- Harlequin-type ichthyosis, 1886
- Specialty: Dermatology
- Symptoms: Very thick skin which cracks, abnormal facial features
- Complications: Breathing problems, infection, problems with body temperature, dehydration
- Usual onset: Present from birth
- Causes: Genetic (autosomal recessive)
- Diagnostic method: Based on appearance and genetic testing
- Differential diagnosis: Ichthyosis congenita, Lamellar ichthyosis
- Treatment: Supportive care, moisturizing cream
- Medication: Antibiotics, etretinate, retinoids
- Prognosis: Death in the first month is relatively common
- Frequency: 1 in 300,000

Harlequin-type ichthyosis is a genetic disorder that results in thickened skin over nearly the entire body at birth. The skin forms large, diamond/trapezoid/rectangle-shaped plates that are separated by deep cracks. These affect the shape of the eyelids, nose, mouth, and ears and limit movement of the arms and legs. Restricted chest movement can lead to breathing difficulties. These plates fall off over several weeks. Other complications can include premature birth, infection, problems with body temperature, and dehydration. The condition is the most severe form of ichthyosis (except for syndromes that include ichthyosis, for example, Neu–Laxova syndrome), a group of genetic disorders characterised by scaly skin.

Harlequin-type ichthyosis is caused by mutations in the ABCA12 gene. This gene codes for a protein necessary for transporting lipids out of cells in the outermost layer of skin. The disorder is autosomal recessive and inherited from parents who are carriers. Diagnosis is often based on appearance at birth and confirmed by genetic testing. Before birth, amniocentesis or ultrasound may support the diagnosis.

There is no cure for the condition. Early in life, constant supportive care is typically required. Treatments may include moisturizing cream, antibiotics, etretinate or retinoids. Around half of those affected die within the first few months; however, retinoid treatment can increase chances of survival. Children who survive the first year of life often have long-term problems such as red skin, joint contractures and delayed growth. The condition affects around 1 in 300,000 births. It was first documented in a diary entry by Reverend Oliver Hart in America in 1750.

== Signs and symptoms ==
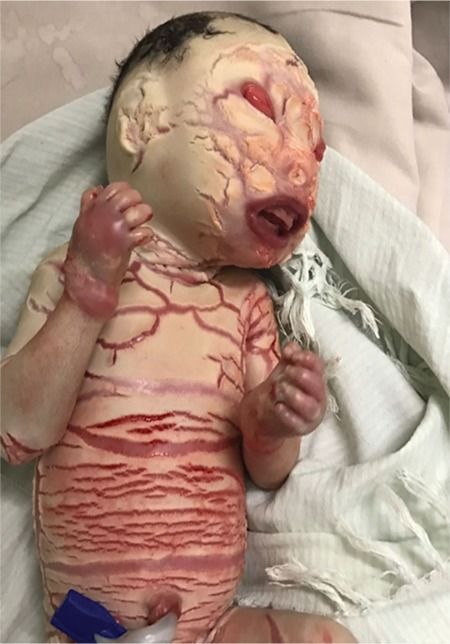
A child with harlequin-type ichthyosis. Visible plates on the skin and changes in the appearance of the ears and fingers are symptoms of harlequin-type ichthyosis.

Newborns with harlequin-type ichthyosis present with thick, fissured armor-plate hyperkeratosis. Sufferers feature severe cranial and facial deformities. The ears may be very poorly developed or absent, as may the nose. The eyelids may be everted (ectropion), which leaves the eyes and the area around them very susceptible to infection. Babies with this condition often bleed during birth. The lips are pulled back by the dry skin (eclabium).

Joints sometimes lack movement and may be below the normal size. Hypoplasia is sometimes found in the fingers. Polydactyly has been found on occasion. The fish mouth appearance, mouth breathing, and xerostomia place affected individuals at extremely high risk for developing rampant dental decay.

People with this condition are extremely sensitive to changes in temperature due to their hard, cracked skin, which prevents normal heat loss. The skin also restricts respiration, which impedes the chest wall from expanding and drawing in enough air. This can lead to hypoventilation and respiratory failure. Patients are often dehydrated, as their plated skin is not well suited to retaining water.

== Cause ==
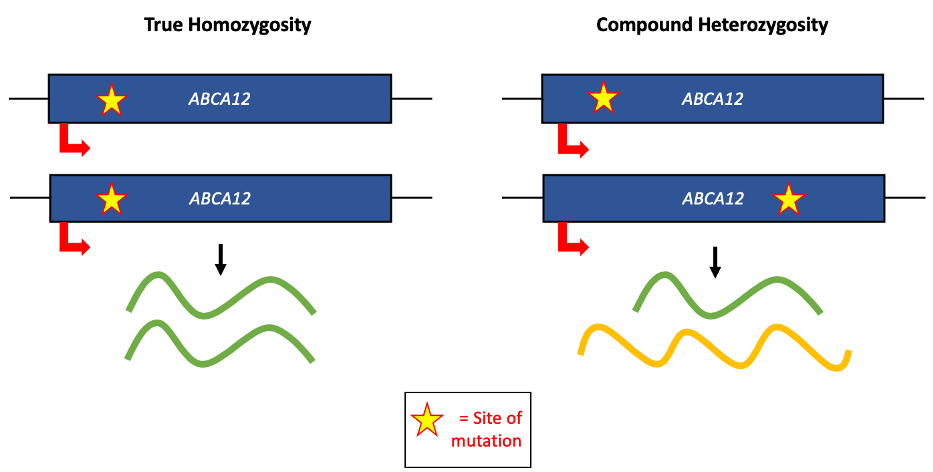
Two genetic mechanisms that can result in harlequin-type ichthyosis

Harlequin-type ichthyosis is caused by a loss-of-function mutation in the ABCA12 gene. This gene is important in regulating protein synthesis for the development of the skin layer. Mutations in the gene cause impaired transport of lipids in the skin layer and may also lead to shrunken versions of the proteins responsible for skin development. Less severe mutations result in a collodion membrane and congenital ichthyosiform erythroderma-like presentation.

ABCA12 is an ATP-binding cassette transporter (ABC transporter), which is a member of a large family of proteins that hydrolyze ATP to transport cargo across cell membranes. ABCA12 is thought to be a lipid transporter in keratinocytes necessary for lipid transport into lamellar granules during the formation of the lipid barrier in the skin.

== Diagnosis ==
The diagnosis of harlequin-type ichthyosis relies on both physical examination and laboratory tests. Physical assessment at birth is vital for the initial diagnosis of harlequin ichthyosis. Physical examination reveals characteristic symptoms of the condition, especially the abnormalities in the skin surface of newborns. Abnormal findings in physical assessments usually result in employing other diagnostic tests to ascertain the diagnosis.

Genetic testing is the most specific diagnostic test for harlequin ichthyosis. This test reveals a loss of function mutation on the ABCA12 gene. A skin biopsy may be done to assess the histologic characteristics of the cells. Histological findings usually reveal hyperkeratotic skin cells, which leads to a thick, white, and hard skin layer.

== Treatment ==
Constant care is required to moisturize and protect the skin. The hard outer layer eventually peels off, exposing the vulnerable inner layers of the dermis. Early complications result from infection due to fissuring of the hyperkeratotic plates and respiratory distress due to physical restriction of chest wall expansion.

Management includes supportive care and treatment of hyperkeratosis and skin barrier dysfunction. A humidified incubator is generally used. Intubation is often required until nares are present. Nutritional support with tube feeding is essential until eclabium resolves and infants can begin nursing. Ophthalmologic consultation is useful for the early management of ectropion, which is initially pronounced and resolves as scales are shed. Liberal application of petroleum jelly is needed multiple times daily.

In addition, careful debridement of constrictive bands of hyperkeratosis should be performed to avoid digital ischemia. Cases of digital autoamputation or necrosis have been reported due to cutaneous constriction bands. Relaxation incisions have been used to prevent this complication.

== Prognosis ==
In the past, the disorder was nearly always fatal, whether due to dehydration, infection (sepsis), restricted breathing due to the plating, or other related causes. The most common cause of death was systemic infection, and sufferers rarely survived for more than a few days. Improved neonatal intensive care and early treatment with oral retinoids, such as the drug isotretinoin, may improve survival. Early oral retinoid therapy has been shown to soften scales and encourage desquamation. After as little as two weeks of daily oral isotretinoin, fissures in the skin can heal, and plate-like scales can nearly resolve. Improvement in the eclabium and ectropion can also be seen in weeks.

Children who survive the neonatal period usually develop a less severe phenotype, resembling a severe congenital ichthyosiform erythroderma. People continue to suffer from temperature dysregulation and may have heat and cold intolerance. Patients can have generalized poor hair growth, scarring alopecia, contractures of digits, arthralgias, failure to thrive, hypothyroidism, and short stature. Some patients develop a rheumatoid factor-positive polyarthritis. Survivors can also develop fish-like scales and retention of a waxy, yellowish material in seborrheic areas, with ear adhered to the scalp.

Most infants do not live past a week. Those who survive can live from around 10 months to 25 years with advanced medicine.

A study published in 2011 in the Archives of Dermatology concluded: "Harlequin ichthyosis should be regarded as a severe chronic disease that is not invariably fatal. Survival has increased with improved neonatal care and the early introduction of oral retinoids."

== Epidemiology ==
The condition occurs in roughly 1 in 300,000 people. As an autosomal recessive condition, there is a higher likelihood of consanguinity.

== History ==
The disease has been known since 1750 and was first described in the diary of Rev. Oliver Hart from Charleston, South Carolina:

"On Thursday, April the 5th, 1750, I went to see a most deplorable object of a child, born the night before of one Mary Evans in 'Chas'town. It was surprising to all who beheld it, and I scarcely know how to describe it. The skin was dry and hard and seemed to be cracked in many places, somewhat resembling the scales of a fish. The mouth was large and round and open. It had no external nose, but two holes where the nose should have been. The eyes appeared to be lumps of coagulated blood, turned out, about the bigness of a plum, ghastly to behold. It had no external ears, but holes where the ears should be. The hands and feet appeared to be swollen, were cramped up and felt quite hard. The back part of the head was much open. It made a strange kind of noise, very low, which I cannot describe. It lived about forty-eight hours and was alive when I saw it."

The harlequin-type designation comes from the diamond shape of the scales at birth (resembling the costume of Arlecchino).

== Notable cases ==
- Devan Mahadeo (June 11, 1985 – January 23, 2023) was born in Trinidad and Tobago and lived to be 37 years old. He was involved in the Special Olympics for over 17 years and participated in both the Winter and Summer Games. He earned silver medals in football at Dublin, Ireland, in 2003 and Shanghai, China, in 2007, bronze in floor hockey at the 2013 Winter Games in Pyeongchang, South Korea, and gold at the 2015 Special Olympics World Games in Los Angeles, California.
- Andrea Aberle (1969 – 2021) died at 51 years old, making her one of the longest-surviving individuals with harlequin ichthyosis, both in the US and globally. She lived in California with her husband before she died from skin-related complications.
- Nusrit "Nelly" Shaheen (born in 1984) of Coventry, England, is one of nine children. Four of her eight siblings also had the condition but died as young children. Currently, Shaheen is among the oldest individuals with harlequin-type ichthyosis, at 41 years old.
- Ryan Gonzalez (born in 1986) was 18 as of 2004, and was featured in an episode of Medical Incredible.
- Stephanie Turner (1993 – 2017) third oldest in the US with the same condition, and the first ever to give birth. Turner's two children do not have the disease. She died on March 3, 2017, at age 23.
- Mason van Dyk (born 2013), despite being given a life expectancy of one to five days, survived to at least July 2018. Doctors told his mother, Lisa van Dyk, that he was the first case of harlequin ichthyosis in South Africa, and that she has a one-in-four chance of having another child with the disease.
- Hunter Steinitz (born October 17, 1994) as of June 2010 was 16 and one of only twelve Americans living with the disease, and was profiled on National Geographic's "Extraordinary Humans: Skin" special.
- Mui Thomas (born in 1992 in Hong Kong) is 33 years old, making her one of the oldest individuals living with the condition. In 2016, she qualified as the first rugby referee with harlequin ichthyosis.
- A female baby born in Nagpur, India in June 2016 died after two days. She was the first case of harlequin ichthyosis reported in India.
- Hannah Betts was born with the condition just like her older sister Lucy in 1989 in Great Britain, and died in 2022 at 32 years old of cancer.
- Ng Poh Peng was born in 1991 in Singapore. Doctors had not expected her to live past her teenage years. As of 2017, she was 26 years old.
- Evan Fasciano, born in 2011 in Connecticut, United States, is 15 as of June 2026.

== Gallery ==
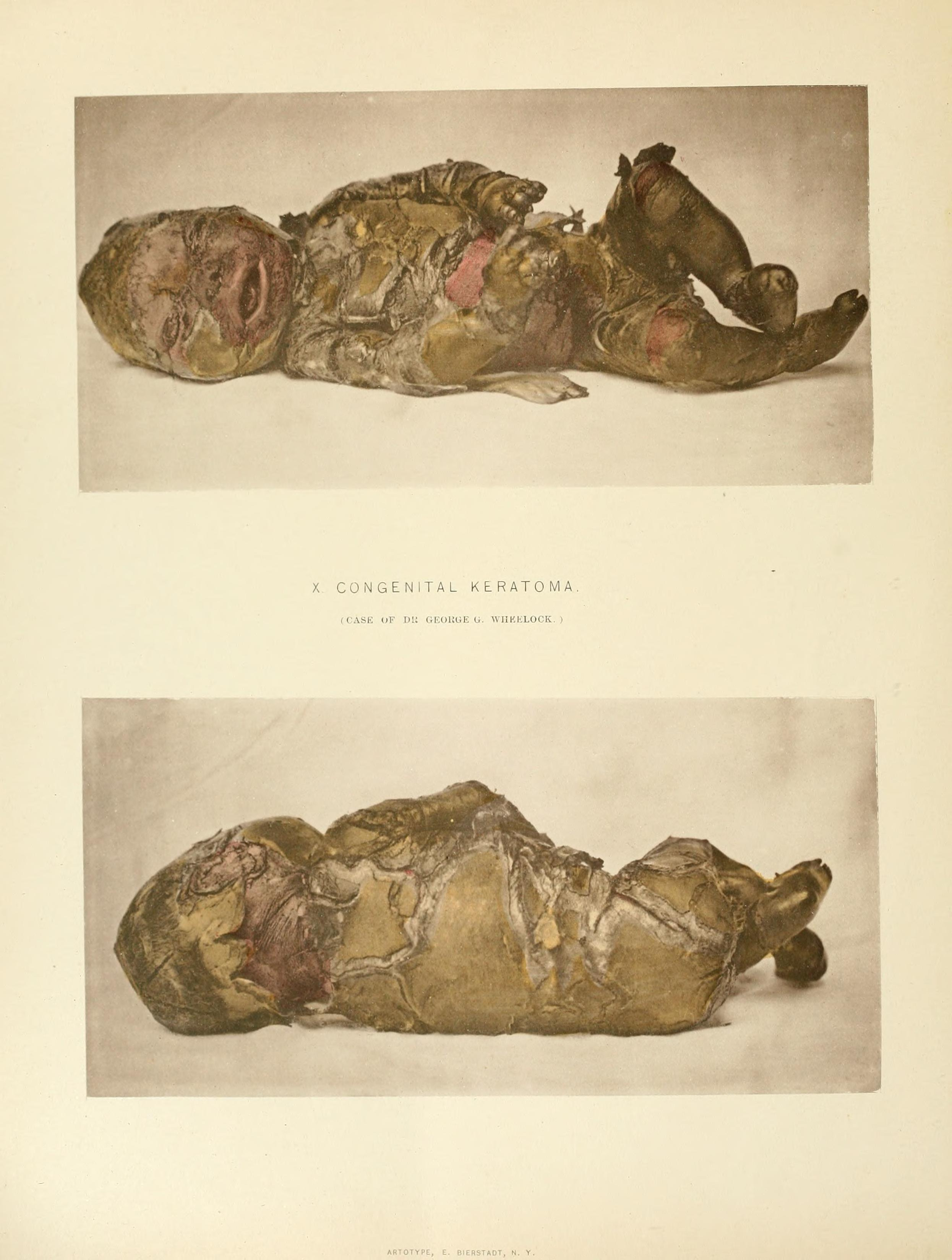
Female case, 1888

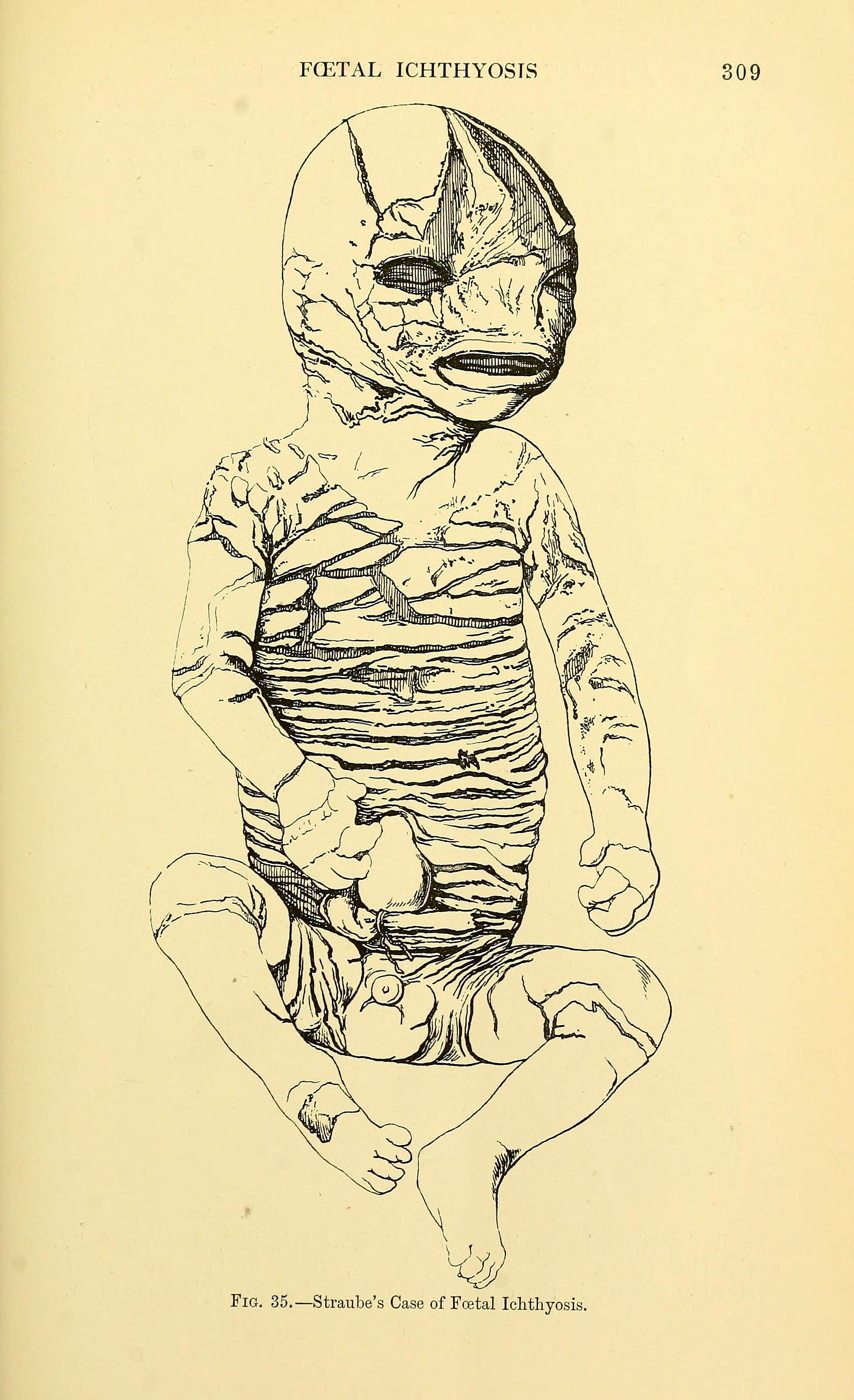
Male case, 1902

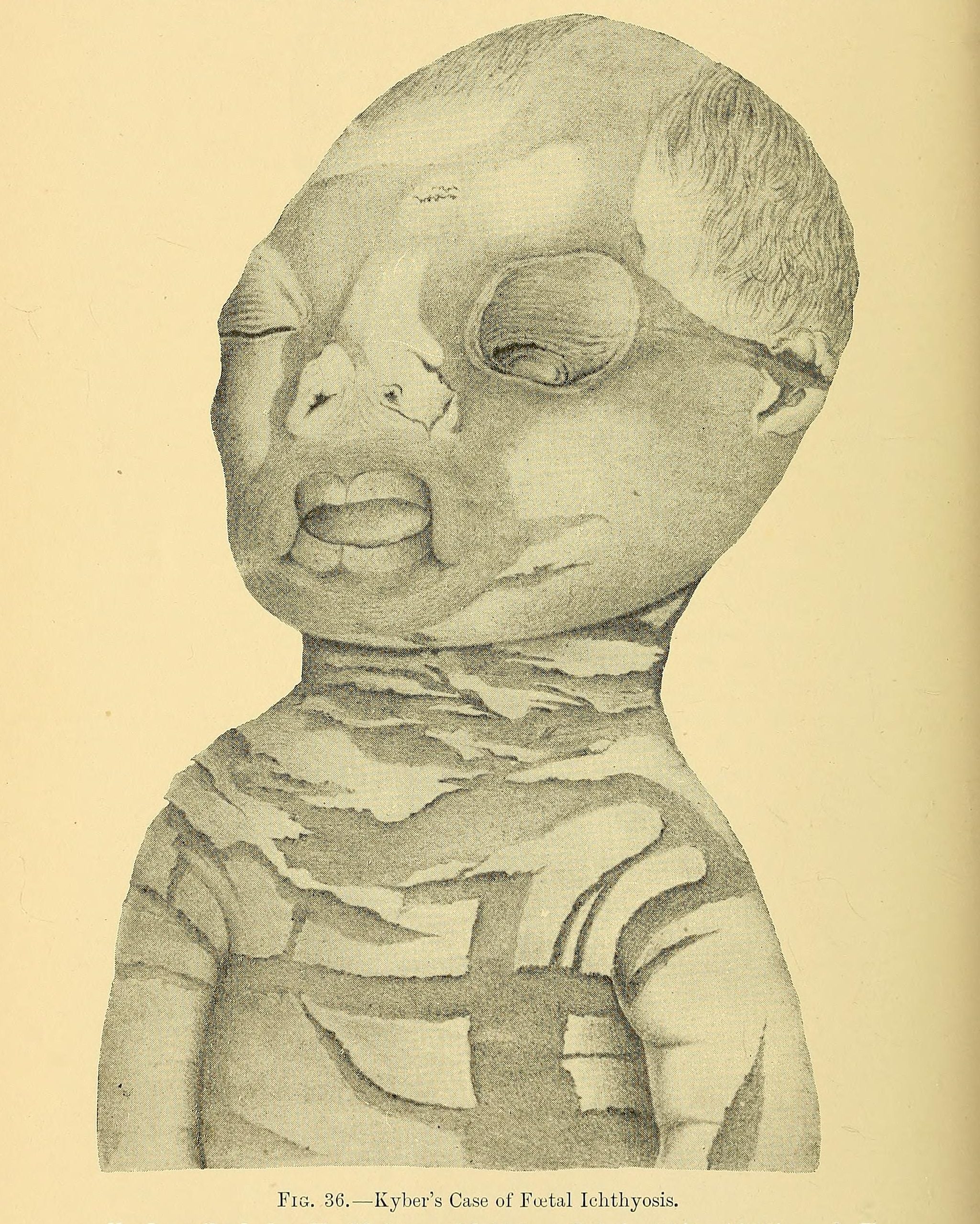
Kyber's case, 1902

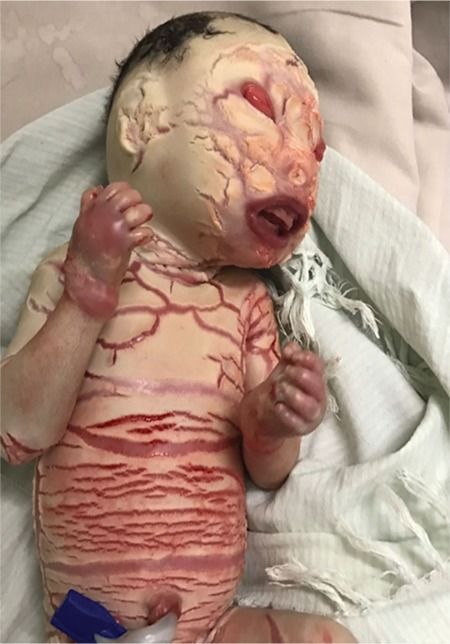
An infant with harlequin ichthyosis

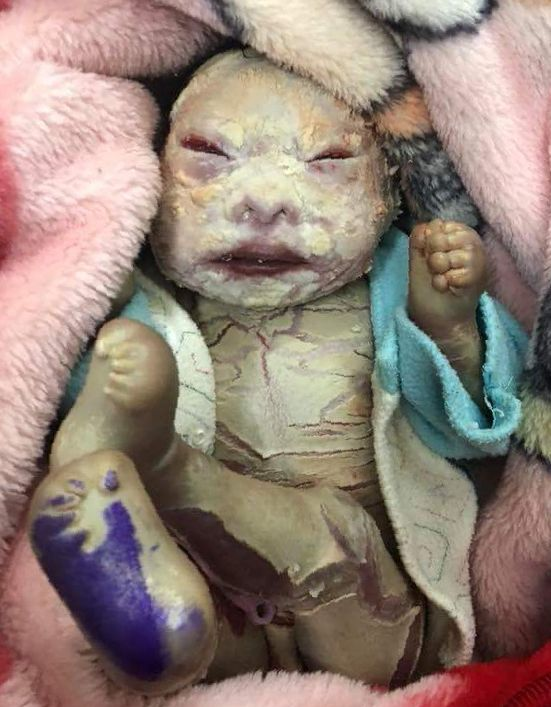
An infant with harlequin ichthyosis

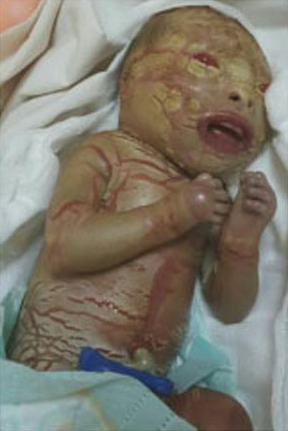
Harlequin ichthyosis in a female infant

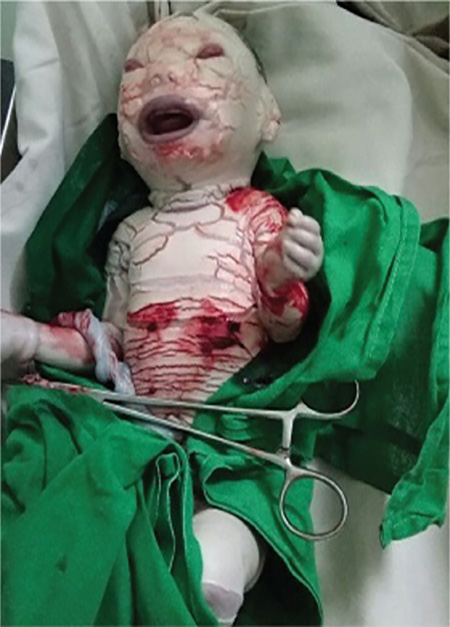
Harlequin ichthyosis in a male infant

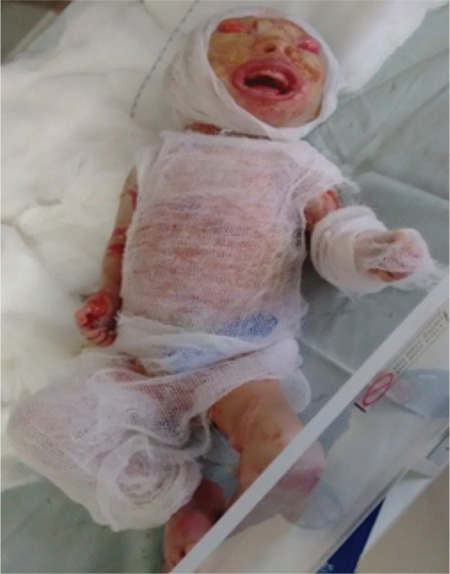
An infant with harlequin ichthyosis, covered in sterile gauze

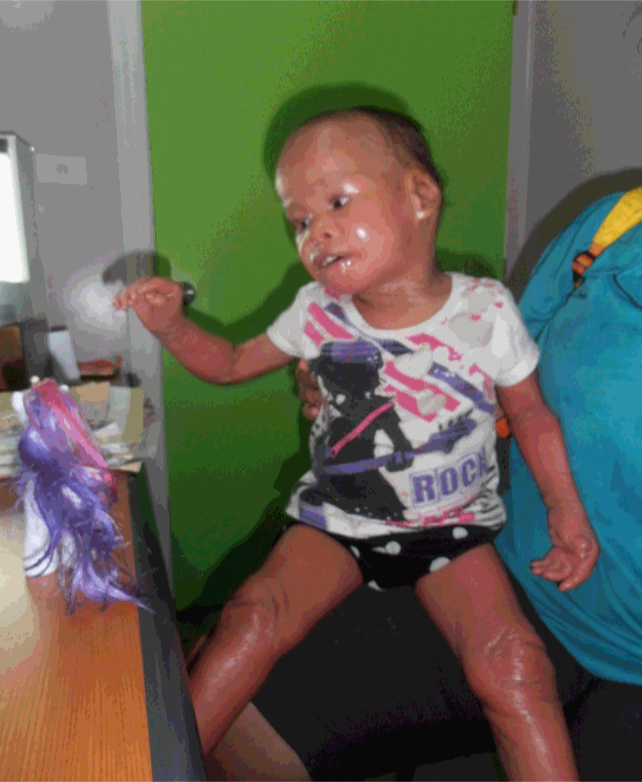
Harlequin ichthyosis in a three-year-old girl, the keratin scales having almost completely fallen off
