= Gary Peck =

American dermatologist (born 1938)

Gary L. Peck
- Born: 1938 (age 87–88); Detroit, Michigan, US
- Education: University of Michigan (BS, MD)
- Occupation: Physician
- Medical career
- Field: Dermatology

Gary L. Peck (born 1938) is an American dermatologist and medical researcher. He is best known for his work that established isotretinoin as an effective treatment for severe, treatment-resistant acne.

== Early life and education ==
Peck was born in Detroit, Michigan, in 1938. Following the death of his father in 1941, he was raised by his maternal grandparents for ten years. His stepfather, an archaeologist, later encouraged him to transition from practical arts to a college preparatory track, steering him toward classical studies and medicine.

Peck attended the University of Michigan for both his undergraduate and medical education, receiving his M.D. in 1962. He completed his internship in San Francisco and his dermatology residency at the University of Chicago from 1963 to 1966.

== Career ==
=== Military service and fellowship ===
From 1966 to 1968, Peck served in the United States Air Force during the Vietnam War era. Stationed at Wright-Patterson Air Force Base, he served as a dermatologist for wounded soldiers evacuated from Vietnam. Following his military service, he completed a biochemistry fellowship at the University of Michigan, where he attempted to isolate keratohyalin granules from newborn rat skin.

=== National Institutes of Health ===
Peck joined the National Institutes of Health (NIH) in 1969 as a senior investigator in the Dermatology Branch of the National Cancer Institute. Upon arrival, he found his intended research area was already being occupied by another investigator. He spent six months in the NIH library, where he encountered research by Dame Honor Fell regarding the effects of vitamin A on embryonic chicken skin.This led to his interest in the effects of retinoids on epidermal differentiation.

In 1975, Peck obtained isotretinoin (then known as 13-cis-retinoic acid) from Hoffmann-La Roche. While the pharmaceutical company had initially synthesized the compound for cancer prevention, Peck proposed testing it for dermatological diseases. In 1977, he initiated a double-blind, placebo-controlled clinical trial for patients with treatment-resistant cystic acne. The study found that nearly all patients achieved complete clearance or long-term remission. These results, published in the New England Journal of Medicine in 1979, provided the clinical basis for the FDA's approval of isotretinoin (Accutane) in May 1982.

Peck also conducted research on the use of retinoids for the prevention of skin cancer in high-risk populations, including those with xeroderma pigmentosum and nevoid basal-cell carcinoma syndrome.

=== Later career ===
After leaving the NIH in 1990, Peck became a professor of dermatology at the University of Maryland School of Medicine. In 1994, he joined the Washington Hospital Center, where he founded and directed the Melanoma Center. During his 21-year tenure there, he specialized in the diagnosis and treatment of melanoma, managing a database of several thousand patients.

He was named director emeritus of the Melanoma Center in 2015 and transitioned to part-time private practice at the Dermatologic Surgery Center of Washington. He retired fully in late 2024 at the age of 85.

== Awards ==
Peck received the Public Health Service Meritorious Service Medal in 1983, the American Skin Association's Inflammation Skin Disorders Research Achievement Award in 2000, and the Dermatology Foundation's Discovery Award in 2002.
