= IPLEDGE program =

FDA program

iPLEDGE program

- Website type: Regulatory/Government
- Owner: Food and Drug Administration
- Website: ipledgeprogram.com
- Launched: March 1, 2006; 20 years ago

The iPLEDGE program is a program by the U.S. Food and Drug Administration (FDA) intended to manage the risk of birth defects caused by isotretinoin, a prescription medication used for the treatment of acne. Patients, their doctors and their pharmacists are required by the FDA to register and use the iPLEDGE web site in order to receive, prescribe or dispense isotretinoin.

Isotretinoin carries a high risk of causing severe birth defects if taken during pregnancy (see Teratogenicity of isotretinoin) and the goals of the iPLEDGE REMS (risk evaluation and mitigation strategy) program are to prevent fetal exposure to isotretinoin and to inform prescribers, pharmacists, and patients about isotretinoin's serious risks and safe-use conditions.

The iPLEDGE program was put into place by a group formed by the companies that manufactured the drug at the time called the Isotretinoin Products Manufacturing Group (IPMG) under the direction of the Food and Drug Administration. The program launched on March 1, 2006, at the beginning of the annual meeting of the American Academy of Dermatology.

According to a study published in 2011, the program has not significantly reduced exposure of pregnant people to the drug in comparison to the previous SMART program. It has been criticized for being overly complicated and difficult for prescribers, pharmacists and patients to navigate successfully.

== Process ==
Once a prescriber decides a patient is a candidate for isotretinoin, they counsel the patient to ensure they understand the drug and the potential side effects. Once the patient signs the necessary paperwork, their prescriber will give them a patient ID number, ID card, and program educational materials. After a patient has been registered in iPLEDGE by their prescriber, they receive their password in the mail within 5–10 business days.

iPLEDGE originally classified patients as females of child-bearing potential (FCBPs), females not of child-bearing potential (FnCBPs), or males. Effective December 13, 2021 iPLEDGE switched to gender neutral categories: patients who can get pregnant and patients who cannot get pregnant.

Patients who can get pregnant are required to pick and use two birth control methods (abstinence included), and must take doctor-administered pregnancy tests in two consecutive months. After the second (confirmatory) negative pregnancy test, the patient must also take an online comprehension test to ensure they understand the requirements of the Program. Once those two items are complete, the patient is authorized to receive drug at an authorized pharmacy. From the date of the second (confirmatory) negative pregnancy test, a patient who can get pregnant has seven days to pick up their prescription. They must see their doctor and take a pregnancy test in each subsequent month in order to get another prescription for the next 30 days.

Patients who cannot get pregnant must see their doctor every month, but don't have to take the pregnancy or comprehension tests. They have 30 days from the date of their office visit to pick up their prescriptions. After that point they have to see their doctor for another 30-day prescription.

Before dispensing isotretinoin, the pharmacist must check the iPLEDGE Program website to ensure the patient is authorized to receive the drug. Isotretinoin may only be dispensed at authorized US pharmacies that are registered with the iPLEDGE Program, and FDA has taken action against Canadian and internet pharmacies which dispense isotretinoin outside of the iPLEDGE Program.

The typical course of isotretinoin treatment will last 4–5 months, and is generally considered to be an option when nothing else has worked.

== Background and history ==
Some dermatologists have praised isotretinoin for its ability to treat severe acne, with current research calling it "a drug of choice" with "immense promise ... in reducing dermal irritation and increasing the therapeutic performance, thus resulting in an efficacious and patient-compliant formulation". However, there have also been many reports and studies criticizing the negative side effects of isotretinoin have been published over the years.

The iPLEDGE Program was instituted as a replacement for the failed SMART program (System to Manage Accutane Related Teratogenicity). Instituted in April 2002, SMART aimed to eliminate isotretinoin-induced birth defects by preventing exposure to the drug during pregnancy. The program mandated two consecutive negative pregnancy tests, birth defect risk counseling and a pledge to use two forms of contraception when engaging in intercourse for all people assigned female at birth of childbearing age seeking an isotretinoin prescription. A voluntary registration program called The Accutane Survey was also established. However, no effort was made to verify the compliance of doctors and pharmacists, only a small percentage of people registered in the survey, and isotretinoin's reputation as an acne wonder drug continued to fuel demand for new prescriptions, an increasing number of which were being written and dispensed for relatively minor cases of acne vulgaris without proper screening, supervision or evidence that less risky medications had first been attempted.

=== Failure of the previous system ===
In 2003, a first-year review of SMART compliance conducted by the pharmaceutical industry revealed that the number of pregnant people prescribed isotretinoin actually increased by hundreds of documented cases over the previous year, before the program was instituted. Of these cases, the majority underwent abortions—either spontaneous or elective—with a handful of children reported to be born with typical isotretinoin-induced birth defects. When surveyed, many pregnant people reported that their physicians had attempted to downplay the risks of isotretinoin or violated the standards in other ways, such as failing to inform them of the need to use two forms of birth control or allowing them to substitute a single, less-accurate urine pregnancy test conducted in the doctor's office for the two laboratory-conducted blood pregnancy tests mandated by SMART. The FDA also concluded that, considering the voluntary nature of the reporting program and lack of mandatory record-keeping, the actual number of pregnant people affected was likely far higher than the reported number.

=== Mandatory reporting and verification ===
The report led to SMART being dismissed as "a total failure", with the FDA quickly moving to halt the downward slide with a stricter mandatory registry system to document and verify all isotretinoin prescriptions written or dispensed in the United States. This was a feature originally included in the plan for SMART recommended by the original FDA advisory panel and wholeheartedly endorsed by the pharmaceutical manufacturers, but removed due to concerns that political opposition from lobbying groups would delay the program's implementation. Although eventually resolved, the older concerns proved valid in 2003 when the launch of iPLEDGE was held up for three years while objections from women's rights, patient's rights, physician's rights and pro-choice lobbyists were debated in committee.

In the U.S., around 2000 people became pregnant while taking the drug between 1982 and 2000, with most pregnancies ending in abortion or miscarriage. About 160 babies with birth defects were born. In 2011, after the FDA put the more strict iPLEDGE program in place, among 129,544 patients taking isotrentinoin who have the capacity to become pregnant, 155 pregnancies occurred (0.12%).

== Criticisms ==
Criticisms of the iPLEDGE program include the following:

=== Difficulty of compliance ===
When the Program launched in March 2006, there were many complaints about how difficult it was to use the system. Launch and pre-launch difficulties were common with the system. Glitches with the website and long hold times were rampant at the time, and became a focus of physician and patient ire. Physicians have continued to be concerned that this very effective drug is made difficult to obtain due to a relatively small proportion of potential birth defects.

Though prescriber and pharmacy populations have become more familiar with the requirements of the iPLEDGE Program over the years, and some of the initial issues with the system have subsided, the nature of the restrictive distribution program continues to cause inconvenience, added expenses, and interruptions in the course of treatment. For example, if there is a problem with the data a patient or prescriber enters, the patient may be locked out of the system, unable to obtain the drug, for that 30-day cycle. Additionally, if a patient who can become pregnant misses their 7-day prescription pick-up window, the patient must return to the prescriber for another pregnancy test before being able to get the drug again. This return visit to the doctor, of course, can be inconvenient and costly. To minimize the number of necessary visits to the doctor, a patient would want to schedule their appointment near the end of a 30-day period, but then must pick up the medicine quickly to avoid being blocked out of the system and running out of the medication. In 2008, dermatologist Robert Greenburg said "For a program to be so inflexible that it doesn't take into consideration the holiday or a patient's extenuating circumstances is such an impediment. It happens often that the 30-day window runs into the weekend when offices are closed. This [iPLEDGE] isn't the way things are done in the real world." "Why is iPLEDGE so complicated? Clearly, it's for political reasons," said Greenberg, citing political opposition to abortion and his impression that morality has guided the policy development more than medical science and evidence of effectiveness.

=== Privacy intrusion ===
Some patients feel that the requirements to take monthly pregnancy tests and enter information about contraceptive choices constitute an unreasonable intrusion, and feel that's too high a price to pay to gain access to this drug. Additionally, maintenance of a pregnancy registry is part of the Program, though participation in the registry is voluntary for those patients who might have become pregnant.

Requirements of the program also mandate, per FDA requirements, monthly pregnancy tests for patients who may become pregnant.

The website does include a privacy statement, which discusses what information is collected, how it is used, and where questions can be directed.

=== Required participation of patients who cannot become pregnant ===
The iPLEDGE Program requires all patients to participate whether they can become pregnant or not, and this has been a subject of criticism over the course of the program's lifetime.

Program administrators say all patients must participate as they are concerned about the potential sharing of medication with people who can become pregnant. Dermatologist Ned Ryan said "They [the FDA and drug manufacturers] want a wide net, understandably. But this is completely over the top."

Though they must be part of the iPLEDGE Program, requirements for patients who cannot become pregnant are more lenient than requirements for patients who can become pregnant. Patients who cannot become pregnant do not need to take either pregnancy or comprehension tests on a monthly basis, and their prescription window is 30 days from the date of the office visit, rather than seven days as it is with patients who can become pregnant.

=== Economic burden on patients who can become pregnant ===
A study of 71 female patients who received isotretinoin treatment from 2010 to 2020 at Children's National Hospital found that iPledge requirements unjustifiably increased the cost of treatment for patients with the potential to become pregnant, especially when windows were missed requiring additional follow up medical appointments and repeated laboratory pregnancy tests. The financial cost is a significant burden that, along with other iPledge imposed barriers, leads to more patients discontinuing treatment before completion.

=== Disproportionate impact on minorities and lower socioeconomic status groups ===
A 2019 study of patients at two academic institutions in Boston, Massachusetts demonstrated differences in delayed starting, interruption, and early termination of isotretinoin treatment course across race. Non-white patients were more likely than white patients to experience medication interruptions and early terminations and were more likely to achieve sub-optimal doses of isotretinoin. The most common cited reasons for delays were logistics associated with the iPLEDGE system, including computer issues, missed pick-up windows, and missed/delayed appointments/tests.

=== Misgendering of transgender patients ===
Some transgender men taking testosterone treatments develop acne as a side effect which can be successfully treated with isotretinoin.

Since trans men who have the reproductive organs they were born with have the potential to become pregnant whether they are on testosterone or not, under the previous patient classification model the iPLEDGE program required that transgender patients register based on their gender assigned at birth. This meant that the iPLEDGE program required trans men be misgendered as female in order to gain access to isotrenoin in the United States. A proposed solution was for iPLEDGE to make their classifications of patients gender neutral; instead focusing on the potential to become pregnant. Effective December 13, 2021 iPLEDGE adopted gender neutral patient categorizations as recommended by The American Academy of Dermatology.

=== Criticisms of the iPLEDGE website and phone system ===
Some criticisms of the iPLEDGE website include that the website does not clearly identify who administers the site, despite being a mandatory program that requires the submission of private information about medical patients. The terms of use and legal disclaimer section of the site do not clearly identify the legal entity running the program or describe how the private information of the patients is secured. The terms of use for the site is phrased as a contract between "you" and "the sponsors of the Site" (which it defines as synonymous with "iPLEDGE"), without clearly saying who "the sponsors of the Site" includes.

The program was mandated by the FDA despite criticism from practicing medical doctors that its cumbersome nature and strict deadlines can make the drug unavailable to deserving patients. In practice, the website has presented many problems to physicians; once information is entered, it can be difficult or impossible to change or correct it. If there is an error, the patient can be locked out for 30 days without being able to receive the medication. Problems are common and take days to correct. Technical assistance by phone is available via a toll free number, but trying to correct problems using the phone system can be difficult and time-consuming. Cathy Boeck, a past president of the Dermatology Nurses Association, said "Nurses are having the same frustrations as doctors regarding difficulties of getting the drug to patients and patients' complaints. It has a huge impact on resources if someone is waiting on hold with iPLEDGE and is also taking calls from patients who are upset and frustrated. That's what we've heard from members."

Although the goal of the program is to prevent pregnancies of women who take the drug, male patients must also participate in anti-pregnancy restrictions, primarily due to fears that male isotretinoin users might share their prescriptions with females without their physicians' knowledge. There has been no link to birth defects from Accutane associated with males using the drug, though male sexual dysfunction has been suggested by one study. As this has not been conclusively proven, this is not acknowledged as a side effect in the official literature accompanying the medication.

As of December 13, 2021, IPLEDGE launched a nationwide update to their system against the AAD's recommendations, the AAD claimed this change would slow down a patient's ability to receive their prescription. The phone system on launch day was completely suspended providing no available support to users trying to navigate a new system that is full of bugs. There has since been long hours of waiting on the phone to get support and when connected with someone are told they received word "not to give out any information. If there are questions you should call the number on the letter sent out or email the original sender that distributed the information." Neither of these had worked at the time. IPLEDGE and the FDA have been heavily under fire in the dermatologic community due to these changes. The AAD issued a statement claiming the IPLEDGE issues are unacceptable and states, "Over the last several weeks we have repeatedly warned the FDA and Syneos that the proposed changes did not reflect clinical practice and would impede patient care; and we asked for a halt to the program until our concerns could be addressed. We were told "no," with the explanation that suspending the iPLEDGE program would not, from FDA's perspective, provide the safeguards that are necessary to prevent embryofetal exposure."
