= Erythromycin/isotretinoin =

Topical gel

Combination of
- Erythromycin: Macrolide antibiotic
- Isotretinoin: Retinoid

Clinical data
- Trade names: Isotrexin
- AHFS/Drugs.com: UK Drug Information
- Routes of administration: Topical gel
- ATC code: D10AD54 (WHO)

Identifiers
- CAS Number: 527736-87-4

Erythromycin/isotretinoin (trade name Isotrexin) is a topical gel with two active ingredients: erythromycin 2% w/w and isotretinoin 0.05% w/w with a primary indication for the treatment of moderate acne vulgaris.

Isotretinoin is a pharmaceutical derivative of retinoic acid (a metabolite of vitamin A). Its mechanism of action is believed to involve reduction in the amount of sebum produced by sebaceous glands on the skin's surface.

Erythromycin is a bacteriostatic macrolide antibiotic used to treat bacterial infections, including the inhibition of bacteria linked with acne, such Cutibacterium acnes. The mechanism of action is poorly understood.

== Side effects ==
Erythromycin/isotretinoin may cause a number of side effects, ranging from very common to rare. Most side effects affect the skin and have only a local effect to the place of application. Some of the side effects are related to vitamin A toxicity.

Very common (≥ 1/10)	Common (≥ 1/100, < 1/10)	Unknown frequency
Skin pain	Dermatitis	Allergic reaction
Rash		Facial swelling
Xeroderma (dry skin)		Hives
Prunitis (skin itching)		Abdominal pain
Skin burning sensation		Diarrhea
Erythematous (skin redness)		Skin photosensitivity
Skin irritation		Skin discoloration
Skin peeling or scaling		
