= Ectropion =

Weakness or deformity of the lower eyelid causing it to turn outwards

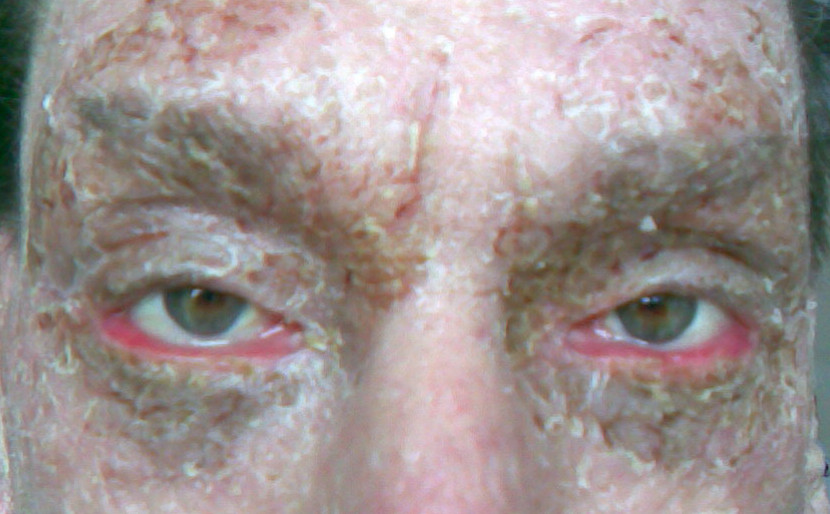
- Cycatricial ectropion of lower lids caused by burns of the eyelids and face – eyes open
- Specialty: Ophthalmology

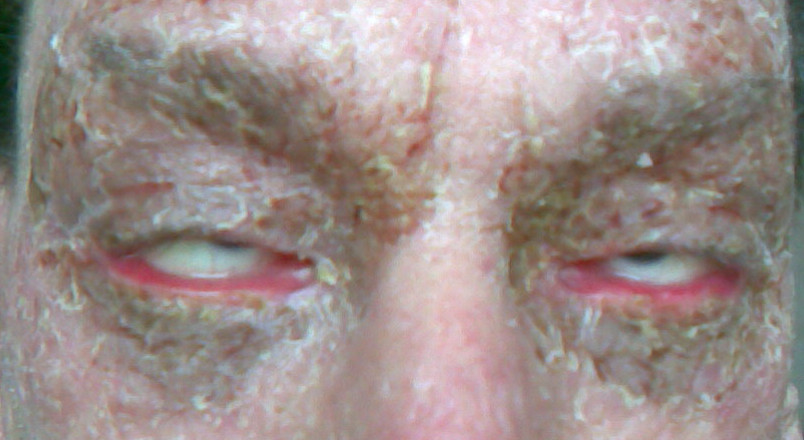
Cycatricial ectropion – closed eyes

Ectropion is a medical condition in which the lower eyelid turns outwards. It is one of the notable aspects of newborns exhibiting congenital harlequin-type ichthyosis, but ectropion can occur due to any weakening of tissue of the lower eyelid. The condition can be repaired surgically. Ectropion is also found in dogs as an inherited, developmental condition.

== Causes ==
The following are the causes:

- Congenital
- Aging
- Scarring
- Mechanical
- Allergic
- Facial nerve palsy
- Anti-cancer treatments such as erlotinib, cetuximab, and panitumumab, which block the function of EGFR (the epidermal growth factor receptor).

== In dogs ==
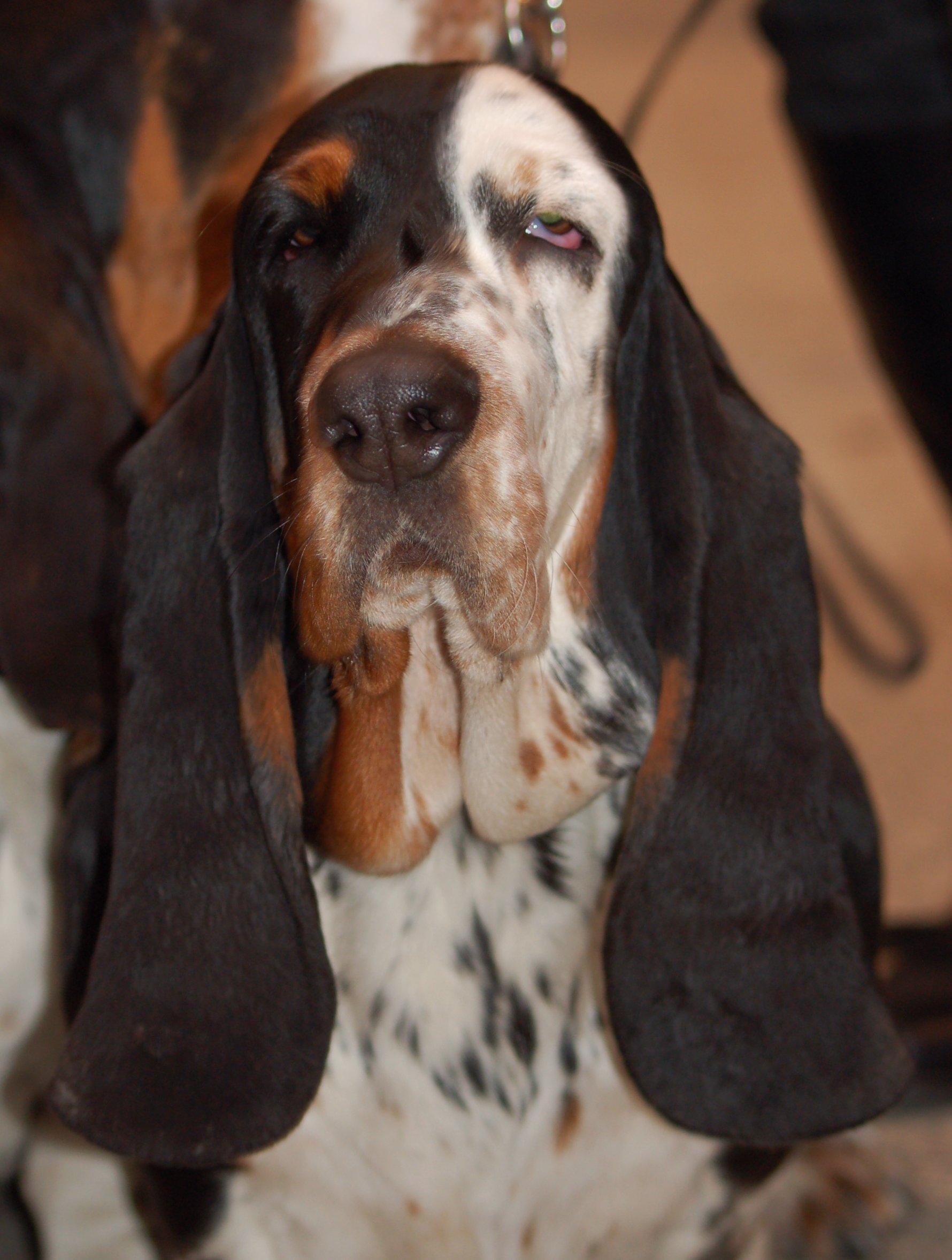
Ectropion is considered a desirable trait by some breeders

Ectropion in dogs usually involves the lower eyelid, with cicatricial upper eyelid eversion occurring following trauma or chronic inflammation. Often the condition has no symptoms, but when the lower lid impacts lacrimation the eye is not able to be lubricated and exposure to irritants (e.g. bacteria, dust) causing secondary conjunctivitis. Ectropion is typically congenital, with it being breed-related and hereditary. Predisposed breeds are the Bloodhound, Saint Bernard, Great Dane, Newfoundland dog, Mastiff, some Spaniel species, and some French hunting breeds. Ectropion is considered a desirable trait by some breeders due to the facial expression ectropion creates. Surgical correction is typically not required and simply lubricating the eye can resolve the symptoms. In severe cases surgery is required.

== See also ==
- Cervical ectropion
- Entropion
