= Challenge–dechallenge–rechallenge =

Medical testing protocol

- Purpose: monitor adverse effects for drug/medication

Challenge–dechallenge–rechallenge (CDR) is a medical testing protocol in which a medicine or drug is administered, withdrawn, then re-administered, while being monitored for adverse effects at each stage. The protocol is used when statistical testing is inappropriate due to an idiosyncratic reaction by a specific individual, or a lack of sufficient test subjects and unit of analysis is the individual. During the dechallenge (withdrawal) phase, the medication is allowed to wash out of the system in order to determine what effect the medication is having on an individual.

== Use in drug testing ==
CDR is one means of establishing the validity and benefits of medication in treating specific conditions as well as any adverse drug reactions. The Food and Drug Administration of the United States lists positive dechallenge reactions (an adverse event which disappears on withdrawal of the medication) as well as negative (an adverse event which continues after withdrawal), as well as positive rechallenge (symptoms re-occurring on re-administration) and negative rechallenge (failure of a symptom to re-occur after re-administration). It is one of the standard means of assessing adverse drug reactions in France.

== Fluoxetine and suicide ==
Peter Breggin asserted that there was an association between fluoxetine (Prozac) use and suicidal thoughts. While his research group were investigating the effectiveness and side effects of the medication, Breggin noticed that only certain individuals responded to the medication with increased thoughts of suicide, and used the challenge–dechallenge–rechallenge protocol in an effort to verify the link. Given the low occurrence rate of suicidality, statistical testing was considered inappropriate. Other researchers have similarly suggested that the CDR is useful for researching the adverse effect of suicidality while taking fluoxetine, and Eli Lilly adopted the protocol rather than randomized controlled trials when testing for increased risk of suicide. In addition to suicidality, akathisia is a reaction to medication which is suggested as amenable to a CDR protocol.

Clinical trials using a CDR protocol are also reported for clinicians attempting to assess the effects of a medication on patients.

== See also ==
- CDR computerized assessment system
- Self-experimentation in medicine
- Single-subject design
