= Myers' cocktail =

Questionable IV vitamin alternative therapy

Myers' cocktail is an intravenous (IV) vitamin therapy. It lacks much scientific evidence to support its use as a medical treatment. The term Myers' cocktail is included in Quackwatch's index of questionable treatments.

The name is attributed to Baltimore physician John A. Myers. Prior to his death in 1984, Myers allegedly had administered vitamin infusions to patients. Despite claims to the contrary, the original formula is unknown; the current "Myers' cocktail" recipe was published by a physician, Alan Gaby, who took on many of Myers' patients after he died.

Naturopaths and other practitioners of pseudoscientific medicine in the United States and Canada often administer the IV drip in clinics and health spas.

In 2018, the US Federal Trade Commission filed a complaint against a peddler of Myers' cocktails and other IV treatments for making false health claims.

== See also ==
- Intravenous ascorbic acid
- Detoxification in alternative medicine
- Vitamin C megadosage
