= International League of Humanists =

- Founded: 1974
- Founder: Linus Pauling, Ava Pauling
- Purpose: Humanism
- Location: Sarajevo
- Key people: Linus Pauling, Ava Pauling

International League of Humanists (ILH) is a non-profit international association of eminent humanists. Its headquarters are in Sarajevo, Bosnia and Herzegovina and its primary objective is promotion of worldwide peace and human rights. Its current president is Sonja Stiegelbauer.

== History ==
ILH was established at a meeting held at the Inter-University Center in Dubrovnik, Croatia (then a part of Yugoslavia) in 1974. Its founders were notable peacemakers and humanists of that time: Linus Pauling, Ivan Supek, Aurelio Peccei, Sophia Wadia and Philip Noel-Baker. The First International Congress of ILH was held in Philadelphia in 1976.
