= Vitamin C and the Common Cold (book) =

1970 book by Linus Pauling

Vitamin C and the Common Cold: A Nobel Prize-winning Scientist Tells how You May Avoid Colds and Improve Your Health
- Cover image of Vitamin C and the Common Cold
- Author: Linus Pauling
- Language: English
- Subject: Vitamin C and the common cold
- Genre: Non-fiction
- Publisher: Freeman
- Publication date: 1970
- Publication place: United States
- English publication date: 1970

Vitamin C and the Common Cold is a popular book by Linus Pauling, first published in 1970, on vitamin C, its interactions with common cold and the role of vitamin C megadosage in human health. The book promoted the idea that taking large amounts of vitamin C could reduce the duration and severity of the common cold. A Nobel Prize-winning chemist and activist, Pauling promoted a view of vitamin C that is strongly at odds with most of the scientific community, which found little evidence for the alleged health benefits of greatly increased vitamin C intake. The book went through multiple editions, and a revised version that discussed the flu and other diseases, retitled Vitamin C, the Common Cold & the Flu, came out in 1976.

The book characterizes the inability of humans and some other animals to produce vitamin C (ascorbic acid) in terms of evolution and Pauling's concept of "molecular disease" (first articulated in his 1949 study, "Sickle Cell Anemia, a Molecular Disease"). Pauling argues that the loss of vitamin C synthesis first arose as a molecular disease, because of a genetic mutation that resulted in the loss of the biochemical capacity to make the vitamin, but because diets of the primate ancestors of humans consisted of high levels of vitamin C from plant sources, the loss of that biochemical mechanism was not harmful and may have even been beneficial. He argues, however, that the subsequent shift to a high-meat, lower-plant diet resulted in widespread vitamin C deficiency.

== Research, writing and revisions ==
Pauling began studying vitamin C mega-dosage, and orthomolecular medicine more broadly, after he was contacted in 1966 by biochemist Irwin Stone, who suggested that taking enough vitamin C would let him live another fifty years. Pauling reinterpreted the large body of research on vitamin C based on comparative studies of the biochemical genetics of vitamin C synthesis in different species, as well his own theories about "molecular disease" and recent developments in molecular evolution. He criticized the design of studies that did not find positive results for vitamin C mega-dose treatment, and promoted those that did. He and other vitamin C advocates thought the vitamin boosts the body's ability to fight all kinds of infection. By 1970, after following Stone's regimen for four years and studying and debating the issue extensively, Pauling was sure enough that organized medicine had it wrong that he wrote Vitamin C and the Common Cold to popularize his vitamin C message.

In 1970, he found an in-depth 1942 study from public health researcher at the University of Minnesota, "Vitamins for the Prevention of Colds", which became a focal point for his subsequent criticism of what he saw as flawed vitamin C research. One chapter was added to the second edition in 1971. By 1976, following confrontations with researchers holding to the mainstream view of vitamin C, Pauling expanded the book to include evidence related to a wide variety of other illnesses, and the flu in particular. That edition and a further revision in 1981 were issued under the title Vitamin C, the Common Cold & the Flu.

== Reception ==
The book was well received by the public and garnered considerable popular attention, resulting in a rush of vitamin C sales. Paperback editions were issued in 1971 and 1973, and Pauling subsequently authored several related books: Vitamin C and Cancer (1979) and How to Live Longer and Feel Better (1986).

The book and Pauling himself faced considerable criticism from scientists and physicians. The book's claim of taking a daily vitamin C intake of 2,300 mg or more for "optimum" health is not supported by scientific evidence. Charles W. Marshall, author of Vitamins and Minerals: Help or Harm?, has commented that the "vast majority of reputable medical and nutritional scientists strongly disagree" with Pauling's recommendations. Marshall also noted that "there have been at least 30 experiments done to test the effects of vitamin C against colds in humans. Most biomedical scientists who have analyzed the results of these trials have found Pauling's claims mainly unsupported in 15 of those trials which were the best designed."
