= Vitamin C and Cancer =

1991 book by Evelleen Richards

Vitamin C and Cancer: Medicine or Politics? is a book by Evelleen Richards, published in 1991 by Macmillan. It examines the scientific, institutional and social debates surrounding the use of vitamin C as a cancer treatment, steming from the claims made by Linus Pauling and his collaborators.

== Content ==
The book reconstructs the key episodes of the public debate over vitamin C and cancer, tracing the historical developments from the initial clinical studies that supported vitamin C as anticancer therapy, to the later evdience produce by the Mayo Clinic studies that challenged the earlier results.

Richards suggests that the evaluation of medical treatments does not rest solely on objective experimental clinical evidence, but it also shaped by broader social, economic and political pressures.

== Reception ==
The book has been reviewed in various academic journals in the fields of medicine, sociology and history of science.

== See also ==
- Linus Pauling
- Vitamine C megadosage
