= Intravenous ascorbic acid =

Nonmedical procedure

Intravenous Ascorbic Acid
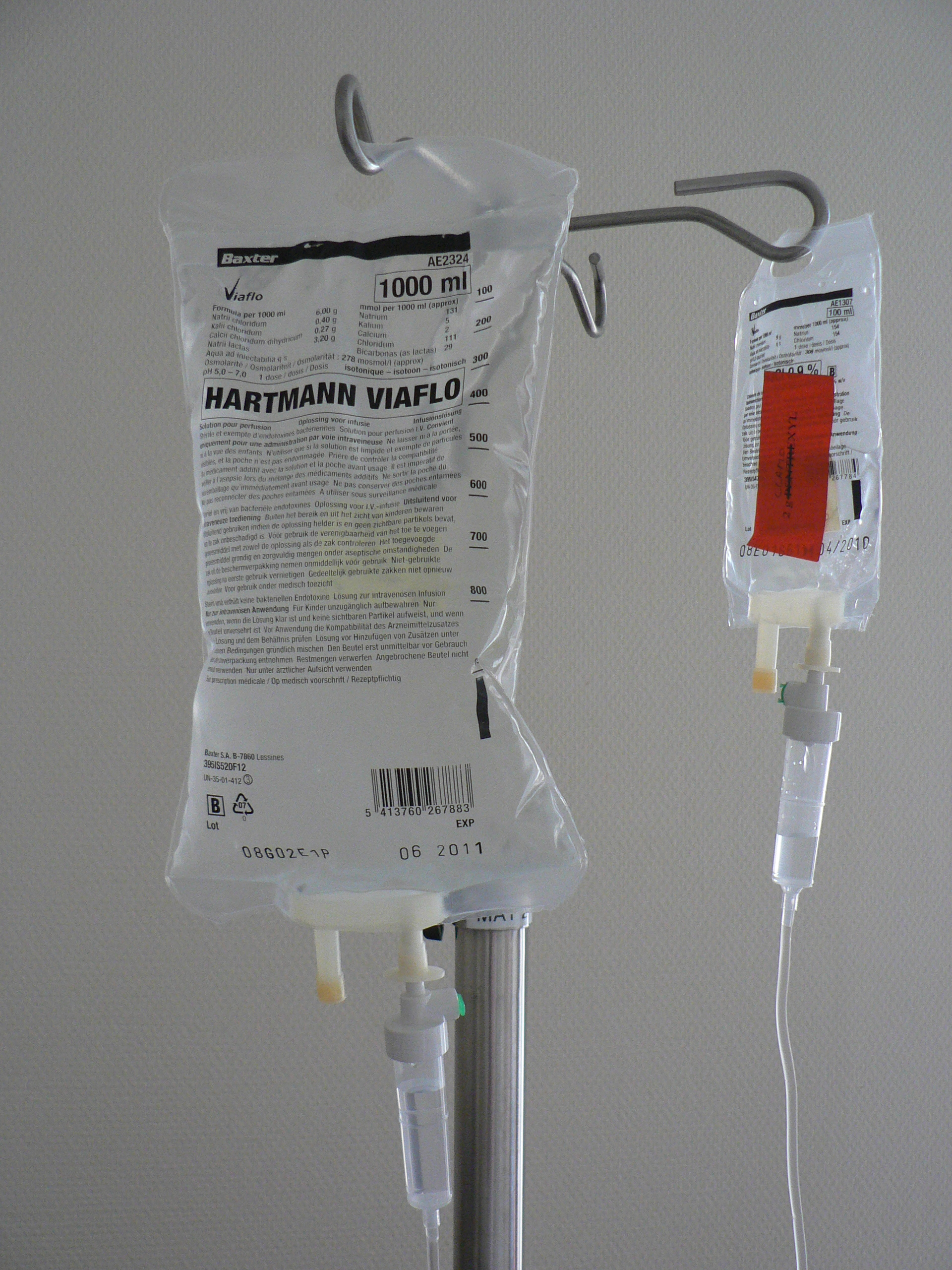
- Intravenous bag and drip chamber on a pole, used to administer ascorbic acid solution through peripheral IV line
- Other names: Vitamin C, Ascorbate, L-ascorbic acid
- ICD-10-PCS: Z51.81
- ICD-9-CM: 267

Intravenous Ascorbic Acid (also known as vitamin C or L-ascorbic acid), is a process that delivers soluble ascorbic acid directly into the bloodstream. It is not approved for use to treat any medical condition.

The use of intravenous ascorbic acid as a proposed cancer treatment or co-treatment has been a controversial topic since the emergence of misleading data in the 1970s.

== Contraindications ==
High doses of ascorbic acid administered by intravenous infusion have been shown to increase the absorption of iron. In individuals with hemochromatosis (a genetic disorder where the body takes up and stores too much iron), intravenous ascorbic acid is contraindicated as high dosages of ascorbic acid may result in iron overloading and therefore, lead to life-threatening complications such as heart disease, diabetes, or tissue damage.

High dosages of ascorbic acid (such as those used in intravenous therapy) have been reported to cause some intestinal discomfort, diarrhoea, as well as increased gas and urination.

== Alternative medicine and unproven applications ==
=== Sepsis ===
The discredited "Marik protocol", or "HAT" protocol, as devised by Paul E. Marik, proposed a combination of intravenous vitamin C, hydrocortisone, and thiamine as a treatment for preventing sepsis for people in intensive care. Marik's own initial research, published in 2017, showed a dramatic evidence of benefit, leading to the protocol becoming popular among intensive care physicians, especially after the protocol received attention on social media and National Public Radio, drawing criticism of science by press conference from the wider medical community. Subsequent independent research failed to replicate Marik's positive results, indicating the possibility that they had been compromised by bias. A systematic review of trials in 2021 found that the claimed benefits of the protocol could not be confirmed.

== Pharmacology ==
Chemical structure of ascorbic acid (reduced form)

=== Mechanism of action ===
Ascorbic acid operates as an anti-oxidant and essential enzyme cofactor in the human body. In in vitro studies, the primary mechanism of high dosage intravenous ascorbic acid can be related to ascorbic acid's pro-oxidant activity, whereby hydrogen peroxide is formed. In the extracellular fluid of cells, ascorbic acid dissociates into an ascorbate radical upon the reduction of transition metal ions, such as ferric or cupric cations. These transition metal ions will then reduce dissolved oxygen into a superoxide radical – this will then react with hydrogen to form hydrogen peroxide.

Furthermore, according to Fenton chemistry, these transition metal ions can be further oxidised by hydrogen peroxide to generate a highly reactive hydroxyl radical. The formation of hydrogen peroxide and hydroxyl radicals is believed to induce cytotoxicity and apoptosis of cancer cells. Although many in vitro studies have studied hydrogen peroxide generation by ascorbic acid, the pharmacological mechanism of intravenous ascorbic acid in vivo is still unclear.

== History ==
=== Pioneering research ===
Although the pharmacology of ascorbic acid had been studied since its discovery in the 1930s, the method of administration and its medicinal potential to human patients was not investigated until the 1940s. In 1949, American physician, Frederick Klenner, published his scientific report, “The Treatment of Poliomyelitis and Other Virus Diseases with ascorbic acid”, which detailed the use of intravenous ascorbic acid to treat polio in children. Klenner's research pioneered future studies investigating the medicinal role of intravenous ascorbic acid. Klenner's work was recognised by Linus Pauling in the foreword to the Clinical Guide: "Dr. Fred Klenner's early research reports provide much information on the use of high-dose ascorbic acid for the prevention and cure of many diseases, and these reports are still important."

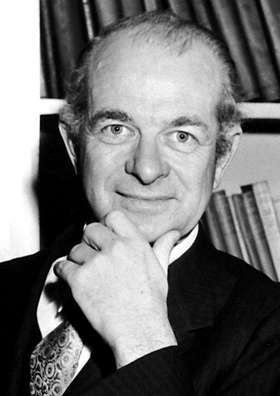
Nobel Prize winner, Linus Pauling, is recognised as one of the early pioneers of ascorbic acid research

=== Linus Pauling ===
Nobel Prize winner and biochemist, Linus Pauling, was pivotal in the re-emergence of intravenous ascorbic acid research. Over the course of the 1970s, Pauling would begin a long-term collaboration with fellow physician, Ewan Cameron, on the medical potential of intravenous ascorbate acid as cancer therapy in terminally ill patients. In 1976, Pauling and Cameron co-authored a study whereby a group of 100 terminal cancer patients underwent supplementary ascorbic acid therapy (10g/day by intravenous infusion and oral thereafter) and the control group of 1,000 patients did not. Their findings reported that the survival rate of the terminal cancer patients increased by four-fold, compared to the control group, stating that: "the treatment of ascorbate in amounts of 10g/day or more is of real value in extending the life of patients with advanced cancer."

Subsequent studies by Pauling and Cameron hypothesised that ascorbic acid's role in enhanced collagen production would lead to the encapsulation of tumours and thus, protect normal tissue from metastasis. Following these findings, Pauling became a strong advocate for vitamin megadosing and continued to investigate the medicinal potential of intravenous ascorbic acid across a range of illnesses, including: HIV transmission, the common cold, atherosclerosis, and angina pectoris.

=== Medical controversy ===
The efficacy of intravenous ascorbic acid therapy came under scrutiny of the medical and science community, following the numerous high-profile studies authored by Linus Pauling in the 1970s. The experimental design of Pauling and Cameron's 1976 publication, "Supplemental ascorbate in the supportive treatment of cancer", had garnered considerable criticism as it was neither randomised nor placebo controlled. To test the validity of Pauling and Cameron's findings, the Mayo Clinic conducted three independent experiments in 1979, 1983 and 1985, whereby terminal cancer patients were given doses of oral ascorbic acid under randomised, double bind and placebo-controlled conditions. All studies concluded that high doses of oral ascorbic acid were not effective against cancer.

The use of intravenous ascorbic acid in the treatment of cancer has been a contentious issue. There is no evidence to indicate that intravenous ascorbic acid therapy can cure cancer. According to the U.S. Food and Drug Administration (FDA), high-dose vitamin C (such as intravenous ascorbic acid therapy) has not been approved as a treatment for cancer or any other medical condition.

There many been multiple studies devoted to investigating the medicinal properties of ascorbic acid. The use of high-dosage intravenous ascorbic acid as a cancer treatment was first promoted by Linus Pauling and Ewan Cameron in the 1970s; however, these findings were not reproduced using oral administration by subsequent Mayo Clinic studies in the 1980s. In 2010, an academic review which detailed 33 years of ascorbic acid and cancer research stated: "we still do not know whether Vitamin C has any clinically significant anti-tumor activity. Nor do we know which histological types of cancers, if any, are susceptible to this agent. Finally, we don't know what the recommended dose of Vitamin C is, if there is indeed such a dose, that can produce an anti-tumor response".

== Research ==
The turn of the 21st century saw a renewed interest in the medical potential of intravenous ascorbic acid therapy. In the early 2010s, in vitro preclinical and clinical trials were undertaken to investigate the pharmacological mechanism of action of intravenous ascorbic acid therapy. These findings demonstrated ascorbic acid's pro-oxidant capabilities to produce hydrogen peroxide and thus, proposed a possible pharmacological mechanism of action against cancer cells. Nonetheless, ascorbic acid's potential as an anti-tumour therapy is still dubious, as other pro-oxidant substances (such as menadione) have been unsuccessful in the treatment of cancer patients.

== See also ==
- Vitamin C megadosage
