= Edward T. Creagan =

American oncologist

Edward T. Creagan is an American retired oncologist, author, educator, and advocate for animal-assisted therapy. Creagan is based in Rochester, Minnesota, where he has been affiliated with the Mayo Clinic for over forty years. He taught medical oncology at the Mayo Clinic College of Medicine and is professor emeritus of oncology and palliative and hospice medicine at the Mayo Clinic Medical School. Creagan was the first Mayo Clinic consultant to become board certified in hospice and palliative medicine.

== Education and career ==
Creagan received his medical degree in internal medicine from New York Medical College in 1970. He subsequently studied oncology at the University of Michigan and the National Cancer Institute before joining the staff at the Mayo Clinic.

In 1979, Creagan was the head of a Mayo Clinic study on the effectiveness of large doses of vitamin C for cancer patients. Creagan and his team provided high doses of vitamin C to 150 patients at the Mayo Clinic with advanced stages of cancer. Patients in the controlled study either received 10 grams of vitamin C or a placebo of lactose per day. The results of the study, which found “no appreciable difference in changes of symptoms,” were published in The New England Journal of Medicine on September 26, 1979. The Mayo Clinic’s study disputed Linus Pauling’s assertion that megadoses of vitamin C can be impactful in prolonging the lives of patients with terminal cancer.

Creagan’s medicinal work includes contributions to animal-assisted therapy. As part of a Mayo Clinic’s use of animal-assisted therapy, Creagan co-authored a paper that combines anecdotal patient evidence, medical studies, and a review of existing literature titled “Animal-assisted therapy at Mayo Clinic: The time is now.” He is also cited in the 2003 book, The Healing Power of Pets, by veterinarian Marty Becker, which mentions the impetus for Creagan’s utilization of animal-assisted therapy. Becker notes that Creagan initially realized the important role that animal bonding had on his patients' wellbeing when he was treating someone with stage 4 cancer. When the patient talked about her cat, her demeanor changed and she exhibited signs of breaking through cancer-related depression. Creagan is quoted in the book reflecting upon the experience, “I think it creates healing of the soul. Some of the energy and the resentment is channeled in a positive way for caring for the pet.”

In 2014, Creagan was elected to the board of the American Humane Association.

== Advocacy work ==
Creagan has advocated for patient empowerment and has been cited as an expert on preventative care, coping with diagnoses, and managing stress. He has mentioned the importance of spirituality, laughter, and animal-assisted therapy as part of the curative process. As a proponent of animal-assisted therapy, Creagan made a note of his patients’ pets as part of their medical history and has prescribed animal bonding. Creagan states that spending time around animals raises oxytocin and lowers the stress hormone cortisol.

Creagan notes that stress management is a key part of living a healthy life. His advice includes good communication, exercise, a healthy diet, good sleep habits, taking a hiatus from bad news, engaging in enjoyable activities, and seeking medical help for depression. Another issue that Creagan has advised on is a better work-life balance in order to avoid burnout. He has also been cited advocating the importance of physicians managing stress with good healthy habits like diet and exercise.

== Publications ==
Creagan has written more than 400 research papers and published two books. Creagan discusses how to become an empowered patient, expounds upon good patient-doctor relationships, and how to deal with a serious diagnosis in his first book, How Not to Be My Patient. His second book, Farewell, describes helping dying patients and their families dealing with the difficult choices at the end of their lives.
