= Martin Bartenstein =

Austrian businessman and politician (born 1953)

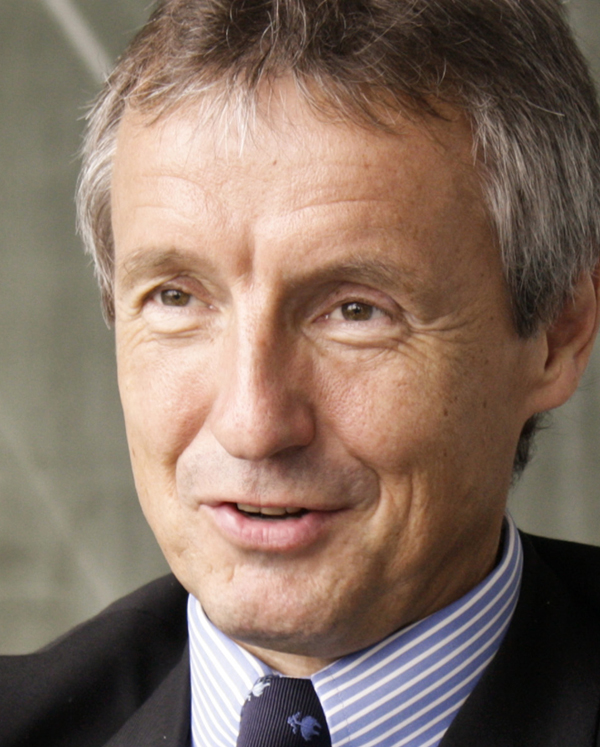
- Martin Bartenstein in 2009

Minister of Economy and Labor
- In office 11 January 2007 – 2008
- Prime Minister: Alfred Gusenbauer

Minister of Environment, Youth, and Family Affairs
- In office 1996–2000
- Prime Minister: Franz Vranitzky; Viktor Klima
- Preceded by: Maria Rauch-Kallat (Environment); Sonja Moser (Youth and Family)

Personal details
- Born: 3 June 1953 (age 73) Graz, Austria
- Party: Austrian People's Party
- Education: University of Graz

Martin Bartenstein (German pronunciation: [ˈmaʁtiːn ˈbaʁtn̩ˌʃtaɪn]; born 3 June 1953) is an Austrian businessman and politician who held different cabinet portfolios between 1995 and 2008. He is a member of the Austrian People's Party.

== Early life and education ==
Bartenstein was born in Graz on 3 June 1953. He obtained a Ph.D. in chemistry from the University of Graz in 1978.

== Career ==
Bartenstein started his career at his family's company, Lannacher Heilmittel GmbH, in 1978 and worked there until 1995. He also founded his own firm, Genericon, in 1986.

In 1991 Bartenstein became a member of the Austrian parliament for the Austrian People's Party. He served as the minister of environment and public economy from May 1995 to 1996. He was minister of environment, youth, and family affairs from 1996 to 2000. In this post he served first in the cabinet of Franz Vranitzky and then in the cabinet of Viktor Klima.

Then he was named minister of economy and labor in 2000. He retained his post in the coalition cabinet formed by Prime Minister Wolfgang Schüssel in March 2003. On 11 January 2007 he became again minister of economy and labor in the coalition cabinet led by Prime Minister Alfred Gusenbauer. In 2012, Bartenstein was made the traffic affairs spokesman of the Austrian People's Party.

== Personal life ==
Bartenstein married Ilse Bartenstein in 1983 and they have five children, a daughter and four sons.
