= Sonja Stiegelbauer =

Austrian politician (born 1946)

Sonja Stiegelbauer (née Moser; born 23 September 1946) is an Austrian politician and member of the Austrian People's Party (ÖVP).

== Life ==
Moser was born in Innsbruck in 1946. Before becoming a politician she taught at a Volksschule. She studied prehistory, history and philosophy at the University of Innsbruck, completing a doctorate in 1994.

She became part of Chancellor Franz Vranitzky's fourth government in November 1994 as Federal Minister for Youth and Family Affairs. She was elected to the National Council in the 1995 Austrian legislative election, her cabinet position was taken over by Martin Bartenstein. She did not remain on the National Council after the 1999 election. An administrative mistake made when Stiegelbauer voted in the 1995 election caused a dispute; citizens in two villages had to go to the polls again, which led to the ÖVP losing one seat to the FPÖ.

In 1999 she received the Grand Decoration of Honour in Gold with Star for Services to the Republic of Austria. In 2000 she led a Council of Europe mission to Bosnia and Herzegovina.
