= Irwin Stone =

- Born: 1907
- Died: 1984 (aged 76–77)
- Education: College of the City of New York
- Scientific career
- Fields: biochemistry, chemical engineering
- Workplaces: Pease Laboratories 1924-1934, Wallerstein Company 1934- 1971

Irwin Stone (1907–1984) was an American biochemist, chemical engineer, and writer. He was the first to use ascorbic acid in the food processing industry as a preservative, and originated and published the hypothesis that humans require much larger amounts of Vitamin C for optimal health than is necessary to prevent scurvy.

== Food preservative work ==
In 1934, Stone, while director of the enzyme and fermentation research laboratory for the Wallerstein Company, worked on the antioxidant properties of ascorbate (also known as Vitamin C), which had then recently been described by Albert Szent-Györgyi only two years earlier. He was awarded 26 patents in industrial chemistry, mainly related to fermentation science, pharmaceutical techniques, and nutrient cultivation.

He discovered he could use ascorbate to keep foodstuffs fresh for longer, limiting the effects of exposure to air and oxidation. Stone obtained the first patents on an industrial application of ascorbic acid with three patent applications filed in 1935 and granted in 1939 and 1940.

== Hypoascorbemia hypothesis ==
Stone's research in ascorbic acid continued and led to his interest in the disease, scurvy. By the late 1950s, Stone had formulated his hypothesis that scurvy was not a dietary disturbance, but potentially a flaw in human genetics that had suppressed an essential part of the mammalian biochemistry and had been misunderstood by nutritionists. He proposed the name hypoascorbemia for the effects of this genetic defect. He proposed that ascorbate was not a vitamin required only in trace amounts, but was required by humans in relatively large daily quantities. He produced four papers, between 1965 and 1967, describing what he considered the true human requirement for ascorbate.

Stone experienced great difficulty in getting his ideas published. However, following his retirement from his position as chemist from the Wallerstein company in 1971, he worked full-time on studying ascorbate. In 1972 he published the book, The Healing Factor.

Irwin Stone introduced Linus Pauling to Vitamin C and is recognised within orthomolecular medicine as one of its founders.

Both Linus Pauling and Albert Szent-Györgyi wrote forewords to The Healing Factor endorsing his ideas.

== See also ==
- Megavitamin therapy
- Vitamin C megadosage
- Orthomolecular medicine
- Linus Pauling
- Archie Kalokerinos

== See also ==
- Papers by Irwin Stone and others
- Megascorbic Prophylaxis and Megascorbic Therapy:A New Orthomolecular Modality in Veterinary Medicine Wendell 0. Belfield, D.V.M. and Irwin Stone, P.C.A. from Journal of the International Academy of Preventive Medicine Volume 2, Number 3, 1975, pp. 10–26
