= Ava Helen Pauling =

American activist (1903–1981)

- Ava Helen Pauling, Pasadena, California (1948)
- Born: Ava Helen Miller; December 24, 1903; Beavercreek, Oregon, U.S.
- Died: December 7, 1981 (aged 77); Portola Valley, California, U.S.
- Known for: Humanitarian achievements
- Spouse: Linus Carl Pauling (m. 1923)
- Children: 4

Ava Helen Pauling (born Miller; December 24, 1903 – December 7, 1981) was an American human rights activist. Throughout her life, she was involved in various social movements including women's rights, racial equality, and international peace.

An avid New Dealer, Ava Helen Pauling was heavily interested in American politics and social reforms. She is credited with introducing her husband, Linus Pauling, to the field of peace studies, for which he received the 1962 Nobel Peace Prize. Most prominent among the various causes she supported was the issue of ending nuclear proliferation. Ava Helen Pauling worked with her husband, advocating a stop to the production and use of nuclear arms. Their campaigning helped lead to the Limited Test Ban Treaty between the United States and the Soviet Union, effectively ending the above-ground testing of nuclear weapons.

== Biography ==
=== Early life ===
Ava Helen Miller was the tenth of twelve children of George and Elnora Gard Miller. She was raised on a 160-acre (0.65 km^{2}) farm outside Beavercreek, Oregon. Her father was a school teacher, and her mother expressed socialist ideals and encouraged liberal thinking and discussion in the home. Her husband Linus Pauling explained, "Ava Helen had been interested in social, political and economic problems ever since she was a teenager. She used to argue with a friend of the family, one of the judges of the Oregon State Supreme Court. She had a general interest in science and was very able, very smart, but she was really concerned about human beings. The humanistic concern she had was very great."

At the age of thirteen, two years after the divorce of her parents, Ava Helen moved to Salem, Oregon, to live with her sister. She graduated from Salem High School in May 1918, three years after entering, and then enrolled at Oregon State University.

=== Higher education ===
Ava Helen Miller and Linus Pauling, Oregon Agricultural College Graduation Day, Corvallis, OR (1922)

Miller met Linus Pauling at Oregon State University in 1922, where the still undergraduate Pauling taught a chemistry course to home economics majors she was enrolled in. After a brief courtship, the two were married on June 17, 1923.

=== Marriage ===
In the early years of her marriage, Ava Helen Pauling worked as a part-time laboratory assistant at the California Institute of Technology for her husband by taking notes, making models and completing other small tasks. Eventually, the couple had four children: Linus Carl Jr. (1925–2023); Peter Jeffress (1931–2003); Edward Crellin (1937–1997); and Linda Helen, (b. 1932). As the family grew, Ava Helen Pauling worked to create a home environment that would allow her husband to continue his scientific work without domestic distractions. Both Ava and her husband were atheists.

== Activism ==
=== Japanese internment ===
After the Japanese attack on Pearl Harbor on December 7, 1941, the United States government proposed the internment of all west coast Japanese and Japanese Americans in inland camps out of fear of espionage. Ava Helen Pauling vigorously opposed this decision by joining the American Civil Liberties Union (ACLU) and working to raise awareness about the government action. When asked by the ACLU, she and her husband provided employment for a Japanese-American man recently released from an American internment camp. Subsequently, the Pauling family was plied with criticism for what were seen as pro-Japanese actions. The Paulings, however, continued to support the rights of Japanese-Americans throughout World War II.

=== Union Now ===
The Union Now movement arose from the publication of Clarence Streit's book Union Now, which encouraged nations to combine into a democratic federation. Ava Helen Pauling advocated this movement and encouraged her husband to become educated on Streit's philosophy. As a result, Linus Pauling became publicly involved in the cause, eventually joining the Pasadena chapter of Federal Union, the organizational outgrowth of Union Now. In 1940, thanks in part to Ava Helen's suggestion, Linus Pauling gave his first political speech, urging his audience to consider Union Now as a movement toward a viable system of government. This effectively began Pauling's career as a public proponent of peace and human rights.

=== Women's rights ===
Ava Helen was deeply involved in the movement for women's rights. Following World War II, she became a member of the Women's International League for Peace and Freedom, or WILPF, Women Strike for Peace and Women Act for Disarmament, an international federation of women's groups in which she held the position of honorary chairwoman. She also worked to bring together fellow activists in support of women, helping to organize the "Women's Peace March" in Europe. In addition to her membership in various women's organizations, Ava Helen served as three time national vice-president for WILPF, one of the many women-led groups that supported the Paulings' peace efforts.

=== Nuclear disarmament and world peace ===
For much of her life, Ava Helen Pauling made world peace her primary political concern. During the Cold War, she and her husband protested against nuclear armament and worked to increase public awareness of the danger of nuclear war. Even after Linus Pauling came under fire from the Senate Internal Security Subcommittee, or SISS, the Paulings continued to campaign for global peace. Ava Helen Pauling traveled throughout the United States and Europe giving speeches emphasizing the importance of peace. She was also instrumental in bringing together various groups in marches and rallies to protest U.S. military policy and McCarthyism. After collecting over 9,000 signatures from scientists worldwide, in 1958 the Paulings presented the United Nations with a petition demanding an end to atmospheric nuclear weapons testing. In 1963, President John F. Kennedy and Nikita Khrushchev signed the Partial Test Ban Treaty. The signing of this treaty directly resulted in Linus Pauling's receipt of the 1962 Nobel Peace Prize, his second unshared Nobel Prize. In an interview which aired on the Nova TV series in 1977, Ava Helen Pauling explained:

I, in talking with [Linus] thought that it was of course important that he do his work, but if the world were destroyed, then the work would not be of any value. So that he should take part of his time and devote it to peace work as we called it. I felt a little guilty about this because of course I knew very well what great and deep pleasure he got from his scientific work, how competent he was in his scientific work, and how enthusiastic he was about it.

== Writing ==
In addition to her social activism, Ava Helen Pauling published a number of articles in various journals such as Soviet Woman and The Peacemaker. In 2006, Oregon State University Press published a detailed bibliography listing Ava Helen Pauling's published works; in a five volume series titled The Pauling Catalogue, Volume III contains "writings by Ava Helen Pauling on issues of peace, civil liberties and women's rights." In the 2013 biography Ava Helen Pauling: Partner, Activist, Visionary, Mina Carson describes Ava Helen Pauling's writing style, stating that "Ava Helen's paper on women 'The Second X Chromosome,' used simple language to deliver a confident and impassioned assertion that it was time for all women to receive the equal standing and opportunities to which, in many places, their legal status already entitled them. Following her initial drafts through her final typed presentation for distribution, it is evident that she wrote easily when she was excited, in many cases framing the ultimate argument in her first handwritten draft."

== Death ==
Ava Helen Pauling died on December 7, 1981, at age 77, after a long battle with stomach cancer and subsequent internal hemorrhaging.

== Legacy ==
In recognition of her efforts for peace and equality, Oregon State University's College of Liberal Arts established the Ava Helen Pauling Lectureship on World Peace, now known as the Pauling Peace Lectureship, in 1982. The inaugural lecturer was Linus Pauling and subsequent lecturers have included Paul Warnke, Helen Caldicott, Noam Chomsky, and Arun Gandhi. Additionally, the Linus Pauling Institute chose to honor her with an endowed position, the Ava Helen Pauling Chair, in 1996.

=== Honors and awards ===
- Doctor of World Law, San Gabriel College, June 19, 1962.
- Honorary Member: Federated Auxiliaries of the International Longshoremen's and Warehousemen's union, June 21, 1967.
- Mother of the Year Award: California State Association of Colored Women's Clubs, Emma Lazarus, and Jewish Women's Clubs of Los Angeles, 1967.
- Certificate of Appreciation: Anza-Borrego Committee of the Desert Protective Council, December 20, 1974.
- Ralph Atkinson Award of the Monterey County Chapter of the ACLU.
- Spectrum Award and Medal: World Organization for Human Potential, May 4, 1984.
- Janice Holland Award of the Pennsylvania Chapter of the Women Strike for Peace.

== Bibliography ==
Per the bibliography published in The Pauling Catalogue by Oregon State University Press.

=== Books ===
- The Pauling Catalogue, Volume 3: Ava Helen Pauling Papers (2006)

=== Articles ===
- "Oslo Conference Stresses Responsibility of Individuals". Four Lights. 21 (3). OCLC 227497400 (1961)
- "Women Strike For Peace". Women of The Whole World. ISSN 0043-7476 (1962)
- "A Great Event". Soviet Woman. 10. ISSN 0201-6982 (1963)
- "Oxford Again--A Rebuttal". Fellowship. 29 (17). ISSN 0014-9810 (1963) -- co-authored with Linus Pauling.
- "The Second X-Chromosome: A Study of Woman". Friendship Universal. 2 (1). OCLC 16965209 (1964)
- "The Nobel Peace Prize". New World Review. 32 (4). ISSN 0028-7067 (1964)
- "You Can Beat The Dutch". The Minority of One. 6. ISSN 0544-3725 (1964)
- "Women In The World Today". The Peacemaker. ISSN 0031-3602 (1966)

== See also ==
- List of peace activists
- Japanese American Internment
