= Vitamin C megadosage =

Consumption or injection of very large doses of vitamin C

Chemical structure of vitamin C

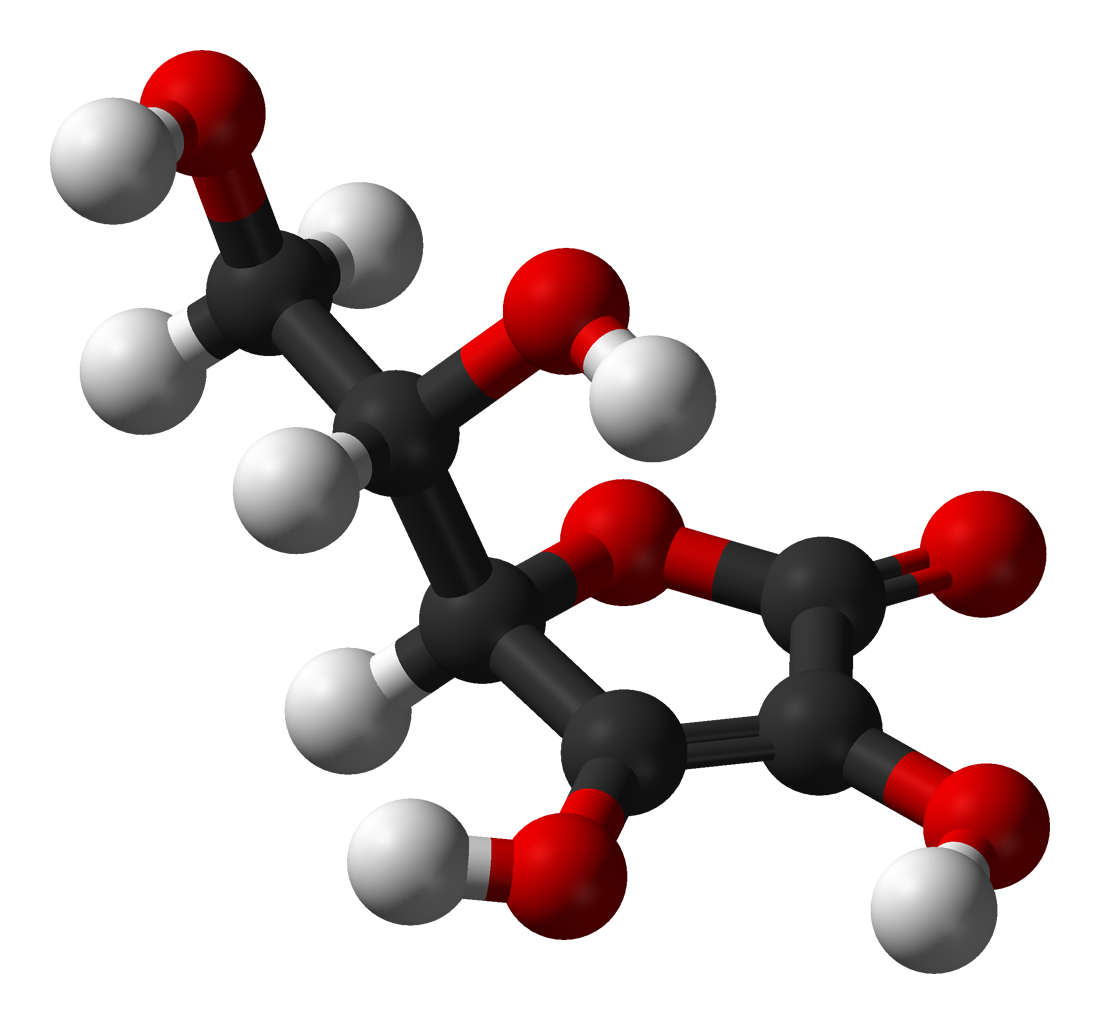
3D molecular model of vitamin C

Vitamin C megadosage is a term describing the consumption or injection of vitamin C (ascorbic acid) in doses well beyond the current United States Recommended Dietary Allowance of 90 milligrams per day, and often well beyond the tolerable upper intake level of 2,000 milligrams per day. There is no strong scientific evidence that vitamin C megadosage helps to cure or prevent cancer, the common cold, or some other medical conditions.

Historical advocates of vitamin C megadosage include Linus Pauling, who won the Nobel Prize in Chemistry in 1954. Pauling argued that because humans and other primates lack a functional form of L-gulonolactone oxidase, an enzyme required to make vitamin C that is functional in almost all other mammals, plants, insects, and other life forms, humans have developed a number of adaptations to cope with the relative deficiency. These adaptations, he argued, ultimately shortened lifespan but could be reversed or mitigated by supplementing humans with the hypothetical amount of vitamin C that would have been produced in the body if the enzyme were working.

Vitamin C megadoses are claimed by alternative medicine advocates including Matthias Rath and Patrick Holford to have preventive and curative effects on diseases such as cancer and AIDS, but scientific evidence does not support these claims. Some trials show some effect in combination with other therapies, but this does not imply vitamin C megadoses in themselves have any therapeutic effect.

== Background ==
Vitamin C is an essential nutrient used in the production of collagen and other biomolecules, and for the prevention of scurvy. It is also an antioxidant, which has led to its endorsement by some researchers as a complementary therapy for improving quality of life. Certain animal species, including the haplorhine primates (which include humans), members of the Caviidae family of rodents (including guinea pigs and capybaras), most species of bats, many passerine birds, and about 96% of fish (the teleosts), cannot synthesize vitamin C internally and must therefore rely on external sources, typically obtained from food.

For humans, the World Health Organization recommends a daily intake of 45 mg/d of vitamin C for healthy adults, and 25–30 mg/d in infants.

Since its discovery, vitamin C has been considered almost a panacea by some, although this led to suspicions of it being overhyped by others. Vitamin C has long been promoted in alternative medicine as a treatment for the common cold, cancer, polio, and various other illnesses. The evidence for these claims is mixed. Since the 1930s, when it first became available in pure form, some physicians have experimented with higher-than-recommended vitamin C consumption or injection. Orthomolecular-based megadose recommendations for vitamin C are based mainly on theoretical speculation and observational studies, such as those published by Fred R. Klenner from the 1940s through the 1970s. There is a strong advocacy movement for very high doses of vitamin C, yet there is an absence of large-scale, formal trials in the 10 to 200+ grams per day range.

The single repeatable side effect of oral megadose vitamin C is a mild laxative effect if the practitioner attempts to consume too much too quickly. In the United States and Canada, a tolerable upper intake level (UL) was set at 2,000 mg/day, citing this mild laxative effect as the reason for establishing the UL. However, the European Food Safety Authority (EFSA) reviewed the safety question in 2006 and reached the conclusion that there was not sufficient evidence to set a UL for vitamin C. The Japan National Institute of Health and Nutrition reviewed the same question in 2010 and also reached the conclusion that there was not sufficient evidence to set a UL.

About 70–90% of vitamin C is absorbed by the body when taken orally at normal levels (30–180 mg daily). Only about 50% is absorbed from daily doses of 1 gram (1,000 mg). Even oral administration of megadoses of 3g every four hours cannot raise blood concentration above 220 micromol/L.

== Adverse effects ==
Although sometimes considered free of toxicity, there are known side effects from vitamin C intake, and it has been suggested that intravenous injections should require "a medical environment and trained professionals."

For example, a genetic condition that results in inadequate levels of the enzyme glucose-6-phosphate dehydrogenase (G6PD) can cause affected people to develop hemolytic anemia after using intravenous vitamin C treatment. The G6PD deficiency test is a common laboratory test.

Because oxalic acid is produced during metabolism of vitamin C, hyperoxaluria can be caused by intravenous administration of ascorbic acid. Vitamin C administration may also acidify the urine and could promote the precipitation of kidney stones or drugs in the urine.

Although vitamin C can be well tolerated at doses well above what government organizations recommend, adverse effects can occur at doses above 3 grams per day. The common "threshold" side effect of megadoses is diarrhea caused by oral consumption of vitamin C in such doses. Other possible adverse effects regardless of the mode of administration include increased oxalate excretion and kidney stones, increased uric acid excretion, systemic conditioning ("rebound scurvy"), preoxidant effects, iron overload, reduced absorption of vitamin B_{12} and copper, increased oxygen demand, and acid erosion of the teeth when chewing vitamin C tablets. In addition, one woman received a kidney transplant followed by high-dose vitamin C and died soon afterward as a result of calcium oxalate deposits that destroyed her new kidney. Her doctors concluded that high-dose vitamin C therapy should be avoided in patients with kidney failure.

=== Overdose ===
Vitamin C generally exhibits low toxicity. The LD_{50} (the dose that will kill 50% of a population) is generally accepted to be 11,900 milligrams (11.9 grams) per kilogram in rat populations. The American Association of Poison Control Centers has reported zero deaths from vitamin C toxicity in 2018.

== Interactions ==
Pharmaceuticals designed to reduce stomach acid, such as the proton-pump inhibitors (PPIs), are among the most widely sold drugs in the world. One PPI, omeprazole (Prilosec), has been found to lower the bioavailability of vitamin C by 12% after 28 days of treatment, independent of dietary intake. The probable mechanism of vitamin C reduction, intragastric pH elevated into alkalinity, would apply to all other PPI drugs, though not necessarily to doses of PPIs low enough to keep the stomach slightly acidic. In another study, 40 mg/day of omeprazole lowered the fasting gastric vitamin C levels from 3.8 to 0.7 μg/mL. Aspirin may also inhibit the absorption of vitamin C.

== Regulation ==
Regulations in most countries limit the claims regarding treatment of disease that can be placed on food and dietary-supplement product labels. For example, claims of therapeutic effect with respect to the treatment of any medical condition or disease are prohibited by the United States Food and Drug Administration even if the substance in question has gone through well-conducted clinical trials with positive outcomes. Claims are limited to "structure and function" phrasing (like "helps maintain a healthy immune system") and the following notice is mandatory on food and dietary-supplement product labels that make these types of health claims: "These statements have not been evaluated by the Food and Drug Administration. This product is not intended to diagnose, treat, cure, or prevent any disease."

== Research ==
=== Cancer ===
The use of vitamin C in high doses as a treatment for cancer was promoted by Linus Pauling, based on a 1976 study published with Ewan Cameron which reported intravenous vitamin C significantly increased lifespans of patients with advanced cancer. This trial was criticized by the National Cancer Institute for being designed poorly, and three subsequent trials conducted at the Mayo Clinic could not replicate the results.

Preliminary clinical trials in humans have shown that it is unlikely to be a "miracle pill" for cancer and more research is necessary before any definitive conclusions about efficacy can be reached. A 2010 review of 33 years of research on vitamin C to treat cancer stated "we have to conclude that we still do not know whether Vitamin C has any clinically significant antitumor activity. Nor do we know which histological types of cancers, if any, are susceptible to this agent. Finally, we don't know what the recommended dose of Vitamin C is, if there is indeed such a dose, that can produce an anti-tumor response." Recent studies show that vitamin C has the potential to be a potent anti-cancer agent when administered intravenously and in high doses (high-dose IVC), but these are primary research studies not confirmed by other researchers.

The American Cancer Society has stated, "Although high doses of vitamin C have been suggested as a cancer treatment, the available evidence from clinical trials has not shown any benefit."

=== Burns ===
One clinical trial used high intravenous doses of vitamin C (66 mg/kg/hour for 24 hours, for a total dose of around 110 grams) after severe burn injury, but despite being described as promising, it has not been replicated by independent institutions and thus is not a widely accepted treatment. Based on that study, the American Burn Association (ABA) considers high-dose ascorbic acid an option to be considered for adjuvant therapy in addition to the more accepted standard treatments.

=== Cardiac effects ===
Atrial fibrillation (AF) is a common cardiac rhythm disturbance associated with oxidative stress. Four meta-analyses have concluded that there is strong evidence that consuming 1–2 g/day of vitamin C before and after cardiac operations can decrease the risk of post-operative AF. However, five randomized studies did not find any such benefit in the United States, so that the benefit was restricted to less wealthy countries.

=== Exercise-induced bronchoconstriction ===
Exercise-induced bronchoconstriction (EIB) indicates acute narrowing of the airways as a result of vigorous exercise. EIB seems to be caused by the loss of water caused by increased ventilation, which may lead to the release of mediators such as histamine, prostaglandins, and leukotrienes, all of which cause bronchoconstriction. Vitamin C participates in the metabolism of these mediators and might thereby influence EIB. A meta-analysis showed that 0.5 to 2 g/day of vitamin C before exercise decreased EIB by half, but these findings were based on 3 trials of small groups, with one study being inconclusive, and all studies having 40 participants in total, and were not confirmed by any larger study.

=== Endothelial function ===
A 2014 meta-analysis showed a significant positive effect of vitamin C on endothelial function in people where this function was negatively affected by atherosclerosis, diabetes or heart failure. Endothelial function refers to how well the endothelium (the thin layer of cells lining the inside of blood vessels) works. This layer is responsible for maintaining healthy blood flow and proper blood pressure. Benefit was found of vitamin C in doses ranging from 0.5 to 4 g/day, whereas lower doses from 0.09 to 0.5 g/day were not effective. No effect on endothelial function was seen in healthy volunteers, including healthy smokers.

=== Common cold ===
A frequently cited meta-analysis calculated that various doses of vitamin C, all greater than 0.2 g, did not prevent the common cold in the general community, although 0.25 to 1 g/day of vitamin C halved the incidence of colds in people under heavy short-term physical stress. Another meta-analysis calculated that, in children, 1–2 g/day vitamin C shortened the duration of colds by 18%, and in adults 1–4 g/day vitamin C shortened the duration of colds by 8%. There is evidence of higher doses being more effective on common cold duration up to 6–8 g/day. The cited studies of larger daily doses of vitamin C do not take into account the fast excretion rate of vitamin C at gram-level doses, which makes it necessary to give the total daily amount in smaller, more frequent doses to maintain higher plasma levels.

=== COVID-19 ===
While earlier, preliminary studies predicted promising results on high-dose vitamin C administration (intravenously) in COVID-19 patients, these results were not confirmed by later studies. Systematic reviews and meta‐analysis of randomized controlled trials of intravenous administration of high doses of vitamin C (such as 12 g, every 12 hours for 7 days) in mild, moderate, severe, and critically ill COVID-19 patients concluded that vitamin C administration did not influence disease severity or mortality in comparison with a control group who took placebo. Although there was benefit observed in some small studies, this benefit was no better than that of placebo; therefore, the usefulness of vitamin C administration in COVID-19 patients was not confirmed by large-scale randomized trials. Intravenous vitamin C administration was widely used in 2020 for treating critically ill COVID-19 patients in China, but 2024 meta-analysis of these studies found that vitamin C supplementation did not reduce death rates in COVID-19 patients compared to those receiving standard care, and total hospital stay was not decreased; however, the rate of adverse effects in patients who received vitamin C was the same as in control groups that did not receive vitamin C.

=== Sepsis ===
People in sepsis may have micronutrient deficiencies, including low levels of vitamin C. An intravenous intake of doses much higher than the RDA, such as 3 g/d or more, appears to be needed to maintain normal plasma concentrations in people with sepsis, as the body's demand for Vitamin C may increase significantly due to the heightened inflammatory response and oxidative stress. Sepsis mortality may be reduced with administration of intravenous vitamin C.

=== Gout ===
There is no good evidence that vitamin C is of benefit for treating or preventing gout and its use for this purpose is not recommended by the American College of Rheumatology.

== Society and culture ==
=== Early proponents ===
The practice of vitamin C megadosage has been influenced by various social and cultural factors, such as the popularity of alternative medicine, the media coverage of scientific controversies, and the personal testimonies of celebrities and public figures, rather than scientific medial research. One of the most influential proponents of vitamin C megadosage was Linus Pauling, a well-known chemist and Nobel laureate. In 1954 he won the Prize for Chemistry. Eight years later he was awarded the Peace Prize for his opposition to weapons of mass destruction. Linus Pauling advocated for the use of vitamin C to prevent and treat various diseases, especially the common cold and cancer. Still, the arguments given in these books were not based on solid peer-reviewed medical research. Pauling published several books and articles on the topic, such as Vitamin C and the Common Cold (1970) and Vitamin C and Cancer (1979). These publications attracted a large public attention and stimulated a scientific debate. Pauling also claimed that he personally took up to 18 grams of vitamin C per day and attributed his longevity and health to this practice. Pauling's views were challenged by many mainstream medical experts, who argued that there was no convincing evidence to support his claims and that his methodology was flawed and biased. Pauling died of prostate cancer in 1994 at the age of 93.

Another prominent figure in the vitamin C megadosage movement was Matthias Rath, a German physician and researcher, who collaborated with Pauling in the 1980s and 1990s. Rath proposed that vitamin C and other micronutrients could prevent and cure cardiovascular diseases, AIDS, and cancer, by strengthening the immune system and inhibiting the spread of infections and tumors. Rath also founded the Rath Foundation, a non-profit organization that promotes his ideas and products, and the Dr. Rath Research Institute, a scientific facility that conducts research on micronutrients and health. Rath has been criticized by the medical community and the media for making unsubstantiated and misleading claims, for exploiting the AIDS epidemic in South Africa, and for opposing the use of antiretroviral drugs. Rath has also been involved in several legal disputes and controversies, such as suing the British Medical Journal for defamation, and being banned from selling his products in several countries.

=== Relative deficiency hypothesis ===
Linus Pauling's popular and influential 1986 book How to Live Longer and Feel Better advocated very high doses of vitamin C

Relative deficiency hypothesis is based on assumption that humans and other species, that cannot synthesize their own vitamin C, carry a mutated and ineffective form of the enzyme L-gulonolactone oxidase, the fourth and last step in the ascorbate-producing machinery. In the anthropoids lineage, this mutation likely occurred 40 to 25 million years ago. The three surviving enzymes continue to produce the precursors to vitamin C, but the absence of the fourth enzyme means the process is never completed, and the body ultimately disassembles the precursors.

In the 1960s, Linus Pauling, after contact with Irwin Stone, began actively promoting vitamin C as a means to greatly improve human health and resistance to disease. The Pauling's book How to Live Longer and Feel Better, first published in 1986, was a bestseller and advocated taking more than 10 grams per day orally, thus approaching the amounts released by the liver directly into the circulation in other mammals: an adult goat, a typical example of a vitamin C–producing animal, will manufacture more than 13000 mg of vitamin C per day in normal health and much more when stressed.

Matthias Rath, a German physician, who worked with and published two articles discussing the possible relationship between lipoprotein and vitamin C with Pauling. He is an active proponent and publicist for high-dose vitamin C. Pauling's and Rath's extended theory states that deaths from scurvy in humans during the Pleistocene, when vitamin C was scarce, selected for individuals who could repair arteries with a layer of cholesterol provided by lipoprotein(a), a lipoprotein found in vitamin C-deficient species.

Stone and Pauling believed that the optimum daily requirement of vitamin C is around 2,300 milligrams for a human requiring 2,500 kcal per day. For comparison, the FDA's recommended daily allowance of vitamin C is only 90 milligrams.

=== Public figure endorsement ===
Vitamin C megadosage has also been endorsed by some celebrities and public figures, who have shared their personal experiences and opinions on the subject. For example, the actor Steve McQueen, who was diagnosed with terminal mesothelioma in 1979, sought treatment from William Donald Kelley, a dentist and alternative medicine practitioner, who prescribed him a regimen of vitamin C injections, coffee enemas, and dietary supplements. McQueen claimed that his condition improved after following Kelley's protocol, but he died of a heart attack in 1980 after undergoing surgery in Mexico. The singer-songwriter John Lennon, who was a friend and admirer of Pauling, also reportedly took large doses of vitamin C and advocated for its benefits. Actress Gwyneth Paltrow, who is known for her lifestyle brand Goop which promotes various alternative health and wellness products and practices, has also expressed her support for vitamin C megadosage, stating that she takes up to 15 grams of vitamin C per day to boost her immunity and energy.

The public interest and awareness of vitamin C megadosage has been influenced by the media coverage of the scientific research and controversies on the topic, as well as the marketing and advertising of vitamin C products and services. The media has often portrayed vitamin C megadosage as a controversial, but potentially effective and harmless, alternative to conventional medicine, especially for the treatment of the common cold and cancer. The media has also reported on the personal stories and opinions of the advocates and critics of vitamin C megadosage, as well as the legal and ethical issues involved in the practice. The marketing and advertising of vitamin C products and services, such as supplements, injections, infusions, and creams, has also contributed to the popularity and demand of vitamin C megadosage, by emphasizing its purported benefits and safety, and by appealing to the consumers' emotions and values. However, some of these products and services may not be regulated or approved by the relevant authorities, and may not have sufficient evidence or quality to support their claims.

== See also ==
- Intravenous ascorbic acid
- Megavitamin therapy
- Orthomolecular medicine
- Uric acid
