= Ewan Cameron =

Scottish physician

Ewan Cameron (31 July 1922 in Dumbarton – 21 March 1991) was a Scottish physician who worked with Linus Pauling on Vitamin C research. He received his medical degree from the University of Glasgow in 1944, and immediately joined the British Army, where he served as a medical officer in Burma for three years.

Cameron was Consultant Surgeon at Vale of Leven Hospital in the County of Dunbarton (1956–1982), becoming the Senior Consultant Surgeon in 1973. He received the Queen's Silver Jubilee Medal in 1977, as well as fellowships from the Royal Colleges of Surgeons of Glasgow and Edinburgh, and the Royal Faculty of Physicians and Surgeons in Glasgow. In 1966, Cameron published his first book, Hyaluronidase and Cancer.

In 1971, Cameron began corresponding with Dr. Linus Pauling. He completed many scientific studies in conjunction with the institute, and published Cancer and Vitamin C with Pauling in 1979. After retirement from Vale of Leven Hospital in 1982, Cameron was invited to become medical director and Senior Research Professor at the Linus Pauling Institute, where he worked closely with Pauling on many research topics.
