= Linus Pauling =

American scientist and activist (1901–1994)

Linus Pauling FRS
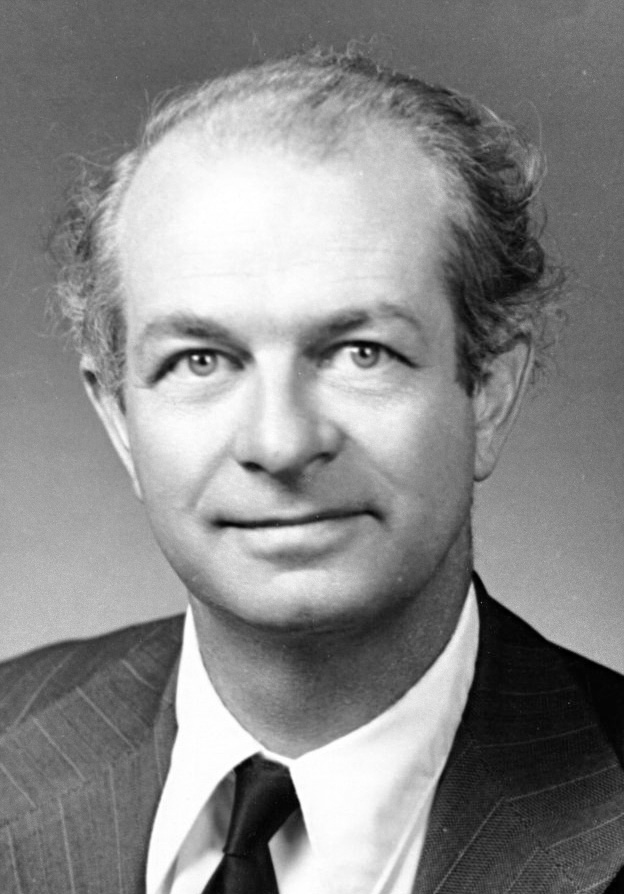
- Pauling in the 1940s
- Born: Linus Carl Pauling; February 28, 1901; Portland, Oregon, U.S.
- Died: August 19, 1994 (aged 93); Big Sur, California, U.S.
- Education: Oregon State University (BS); California Institute of Technology (PhD)
- Known for: See list: Alpha sheet; Ancestral sequence reconstruction; Backbonding; Beta sheet; Bond order; Breath gas analysis; Coiled coil; Corey–Pauling rules; CPK coloring; Crystal structure prediction; Electronegativity; Elucidating chemical bonds and molecular structures; Geometrical frustration; Hybridisation theory; Hydrogen bonding; Ice-type model; Linear combination of atomic orbitals; Molecular clock; Molecular medicine; Non-carbon nanotube; Orbital overlap; Pauling equation; Pauling's rules; Pauling–Corey–Branson alpha helix; Pauling's principle of electroneutrality; Quantum chemistry; Quantum graph; Residual entropy; Resonance (chemistry); Slater–Pauling rule; Space-filling model; Valence bond theory; Vitamin C megadosage; Xenic acid; Advocating nuclear disarmament
- Spouse: Ava Helen Miller (m. 1923; died 1981)
- Children: 4
- Awards: ACS Award in Pure Chemistry (1931); Irving Langmuir Award (1931); Davy Medal (1947); Nobel Prize in Chemistry (1954); Nobel Peace Prize (1962); Roebling Medal (1967); Lenin Peace Prize (1968–1969); National Medal of Science (1974); Lomonosov Gold Medal (1977); NAS Award in Chemical Sciences (1979); Priestley Medal (1984); Vannevar Bush Award (1989)
- Scientific career
- Fields: Quantum chemistry; Biochemistry
- Workplaces: As faculty member: Caltech (1927–1963); UC San Diego (1967–1969); Stanford (1969–1975); As fellow: Cornell University (1937–1938); University of Oxford (1948); Center for the Study of Democratic Institutions (1963–1967)
- Thesis: The Determination with X-Rays of the Structures of Crystals (1925)
- Doctoral advisor: Roscoe Dickinson; Richard Tolman
- Other academic advisors: Arnold Sommerfeld; Niels Bohr
- Doctoral students: Jerry Donohue; Harvey Itano; Barclay Kamb; Martin Karplus; Leonard Lerman; William Lipscomb; Matthew Meselson; Kurt Mislow; Arthur Pardee; Robert E. Rundle; Edgar Bright Wilson
- Other notable students: Undergrads: Edwin McMillan; Post-docs: Charles D. Coryell; Jack D. Dunitz; Sidney W. Fox; Walter Gordy; Edgar Heilbronner; Jan Ketelaar; Hans Kuhn; Leslie Orgel; Alexander Rich; Seymour Jonathan Singer

Notes
- The only person to win two unshared Nobel Prizes

Linus Carl Pauling (/ˈpɔːlɪŋ/ PAW-ling; February 28, 1901 – August 19, 1994) was an American chemist and peace activist. He published more than 1,200 papers and books, of which about 850 dealt with scientific topics. Scientific American called him one of the 20 greatest scientists of all time. For his scientific work, Pauling was awarded the Nobel Prize in Chemistry in 1954. For his peace activism, he was awarded the Nobel Peace Prize in 1962. He is one of five people to have won more than one Nobel Prize. Of these, he is the only person to have been awarded two unshared Nobel Prizes, and one of two people to be awarded Nobel Prizes in different fields, the other being Marie Curie.

Pauling was one of the founders of the fields of quantum chemistry and molecular biology. His contributions to the theory of the chemical bond include the concept of orbital hybridisation and the first accurate scale of electronegativities of the elements. Pauling also worked on the structures of biological molecules, and showed the importance of the alpha helix and beta sheet in protein secondary structure. Pauling's approach combined methods and results from X-ray crystallography, molecular model building, and quantum chemistry. His discoveries inspired the work of James Watson, Francis Crick, Rosalind Franklin, and Maurice Wilkins on the structure of DNA, which in turn made it possible for geneticists to crack the DNA code of all organisms.

In his later years, he promoted nuclear disarmament, as well as orthomolecular medicine, megavitamin therapy, and dietary supplements, especially ascorbic acid (commonly known as Vitamin C). None of his ideas concerning the medical usefulness of large doses of vitamins have gained much acceptance in the mainstream scientific community. He was married to the American human rights activist Ava Helen Pauling.

== Early life and education ==
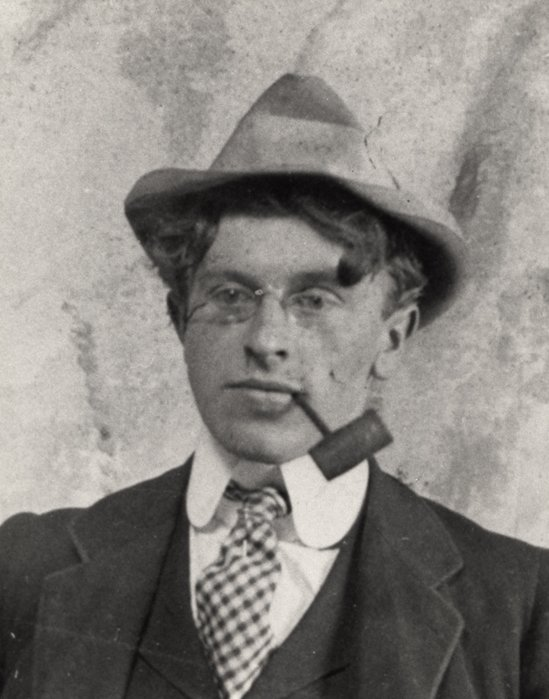
Herman Henry William Pauling, Linus Pauling's father, c. 1900

Linus Carl Pauling was born on February 28, 1901, in Portland, Oregon, the firstborn child of Herman Henry William Pauling (1876–1910) and Lucy Isabelle "Belle" Darling (1881–1926). He was named "Linus Carl", in honor of Lucy's father, Linus, and Herman's father, Carl. His ancestry included German and English-Scottish.

In 1902, after his sister Pauline was born, Pauling's parents decided to move out of Portland to find more affordable and spacious living quarters than their one-room apartment. Lucy stayed with her husband's parents in Lake Oswego until Herman brought the family to Salem, where he worked briefly as a traveling salesman for the Skidmore Drug Company. Within a year of Lucile's birth in 1904, Herman Pauling moved his family to Lake Oswego, Oregon where he opened his own drugstore. He moved his family to Condon, Oregon, in 1905. By 1906, Herman Pauling was suffering from recurrent abdominal pain. He died of a perforated ulcer on June 11, 1910, leaving Lucy to care for Linus, Lucile and Pauline.

Pauling attributes his interest in becoming a chemist to being amazed by experiments conducted by a friend, Lloyd A. Jeffress, who had a small chemistry lab kit. He later wrote: "I was simply entranced by chemical phenomena, by the reactions in which substances, often with strikingly different properties, appear; and I hoped to learn more and more about this aspect of the world."

In high school, Pauling conducted chemistry experiments by scavenging equipment and material from an abandoned steel plant. With an older friend, Lloyd Simon, Pauling set up Palmon Laboratories in Simon's basement. They approached local dairies offering to perform butterfat samplings at cheap prices but dairymen were wary of trusting two boys with the task, and the business ended in failure.

At age 15, the high school senior had enough credits to enter Oregon State University (OSU), known then as Oregon Agricultural College. Lacking two American history courses required for his high school diploma, Pauling asked the school principal if he could take the courses concurrently during the spring semester. Denied, he left Washington High School in June without a diploma. The school awarded him an honorary diploma 45 years later, after he was awarded two Nobel Prizes.

Pauling held a number of jobs to earn money for his future college expenses, including working part-time at a grocery store for US$8 per week (equivalent to US$240 in 2025). His mother arranged an interview with the owner of a number of manufacturing plants in Portland, Mr. Schwietzerhoff, who hired him as an apprentice machinist at a salary of US$40 per month (equivalent to US$1,180 in 2025). This was soon raised to US$50 per month. Pauling also set up a photography laboratory with two friends. In September 1917, Pauling was finally admitted by Oregon State University. He immediately resigned from the machinist's job and informed his mother, who saw no point in a university education, of his plans.

=== Higher education ===
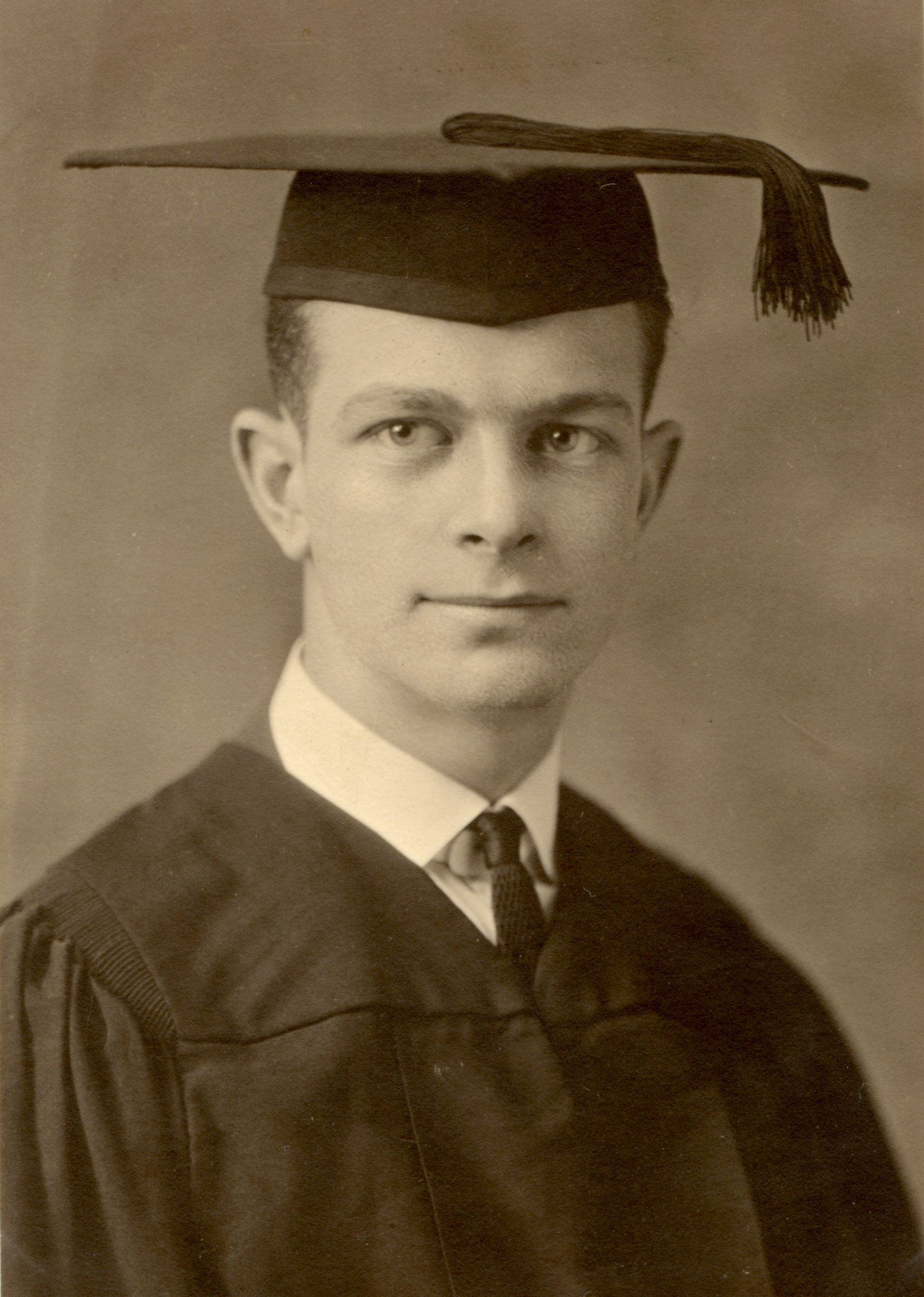
Pauling's graduation photo from Oregon State University, 1922

In his first semester, Pauling registered for two courses in chemistry, two in mathematics, mechanical drawing, introduction to mining and use of explosives, modern English prose, gymnastics and military drill. His roommate was childhood pal and lifelong best friend Lloyd Jeffress. He was active in campus life and founded the school's chapter of the Delta Upsilon fraternity. After his second year, he planned to take a job in Portland to help support his mother. The college offered him a position teaching quantitative analysis, a course he had just finished taking himself. He worked forty hours a week in the laboratory and classroom and earned US$100 a month (equivalent to US$1,600 in 2025), enabling him to continue his studies.

In his last two years at school, Pauling became aware of the work of Gilbert N. Lewis and Irving Langmuir on the electronic structure of atoms and their bonding to form molecules. He decided to focus his research on how the physical and chemical properties of substances are related to the structure of the atoms of which they are composed, becoming one of the founders of the new science of quantum chemistry.

Engineering professor Samuel Graf (1887–1966) selected Pauling to be his teaching assistant in a mechanics and materials course. During the winter of his senior year, Pauling taught a chemistry course for home economics majors. It was in one of these classes that Pauling met his future wife, Ava Helen Miller.

In 1922, Pauling graduated with a degree in chemical engineering. He went on to graduate school at the California Institute of Technology (Caltech) in Pasadena, California, under the guidance of Roscoe Dickinson and Richard Tolman. His graduate research involved the use of X-ray diffraction to determine the structure of crystals. He published seven papers on the crystal structure of minerals while he was at Caltech. He received his PhD in physical chemistry and mathematical physics, summa cum laude, in 1925.

== Career ==
External videos
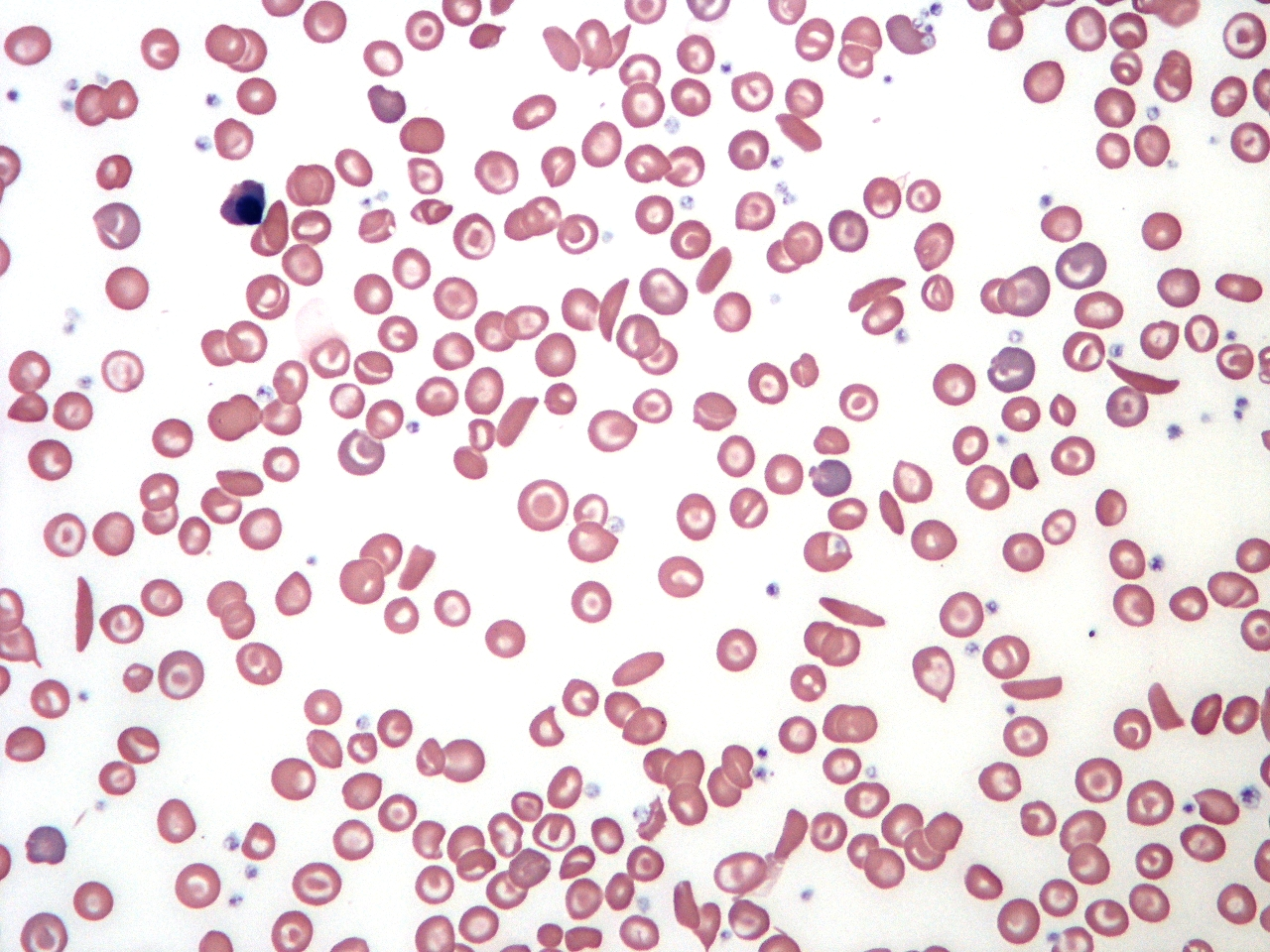
- Linus Pauling, Oregon Experience, Oregon Historical Society

In 1926, Pauling was awarded a Guggenheim Fellowship to travel to Europe, to study under German physicist Arnold Sommerfeld in Munich, Danish physicist Niels Bohr in Copenhagen and Austrian physicist Erwin Schrödinger in Zürich. All three were experts in the new field of quantum mechanics and other branches of physics. Pauling became interested in how quantum mechanics might be applied in his chosen field of interest, the electronic structure of atoms and molecules. In Zürich, Pauling was also exposed to one of the first quantum mechanical analyses of bonding in the hydrogen molecule, done by Walter Heitler and Fritz London. Pauling devoted the two years of his European trip to this work and decided to make it the focus of his future research. He became one of the first scientists in the field of quantum chemistry and a pioneer in the application of quantum theory to the structure of molecules.

In 1927, Pauling took a new position as an assistant professor at Caltech in theoretical chemistry. He launched his faculty career with a very productive five years, continuing with his X-ray crystal studies and also performing quantum mechanical calculations on atoms and molecules. He published approximately fifty papers in those five years, and created the five rules now known as Pauling's rules. By 1929, he was promoted to associate professor, and by 1930, to full professor. In 1931, the American Chemical Society awarded Pauling the Langmuir Prize for the most significant work in pure science by a person 30 years of age or younger. The following year, Pauling published what he regarded as his most important paper, in which he first laid out the concept of hybridization of atomic orbitals and analyzed the tetravalency of the carbon atom.

At Caltech, Pauling struck up a close friendship with theoretical physicist Robert Oppenheimer at the University of California, Berkeley, who spent part of his research and teaching schedule as a visitor at Caltech each year. Pauling was also affiliated with Berkeley, serving as a visiting lecturer in physics and chemistry from 1929 to 1934. Oppenheimer even gave Pauling a stunning personal collection of minerals. The two men planned to mount a joint attack on the nature of the chemical bond: apparently Oppenheimer would supply the mathematics and Pauling would interpret the results. Their relationship soured when Oppenheimer tried to pursue Pauling's wife, Ava Helen. When Pauling was at work, Oppenheimer came to their home and blurted out an invitation to Ava Helen to join him on a tryst in Mexico. She flatly refused, and reported the incident to Pauling. He immediately cut off his relationship with Oppenheimer.

In the summer of 1930, Pauling made another European trip, during which he learned about gas-phase electron diffraction from Herman Francis Mark. After returning, he built an electron diffraction instrument at Caltech with a student of his, Lawrence Olin Brockway, and used it to study the molecular structure of a large number of chemical substances.

Pauling introduced the concept of electronegativity in 1932. Using the various properties of molecules, such as the energy required to break bonds and the dipole moments of molecules, he established a scale and an associated numerical value for most of the elements — the Pauling Electronegativity Scale — which is useful in predicting the nature of bonds between atoms in molecules.

In 1936, Pauling was promoted to chairman of the division of chemistry and chemical engineering at Caltech, and to the position of director of the Gates and Crellin Laboratories of Chemistry. He would hold both positions until 1958. Pauling also spent a year in 1948 at the University of Oxford as George Eastman Visiting Professor and Fellow of Balliol.

=== Nature of the chemical bond ===
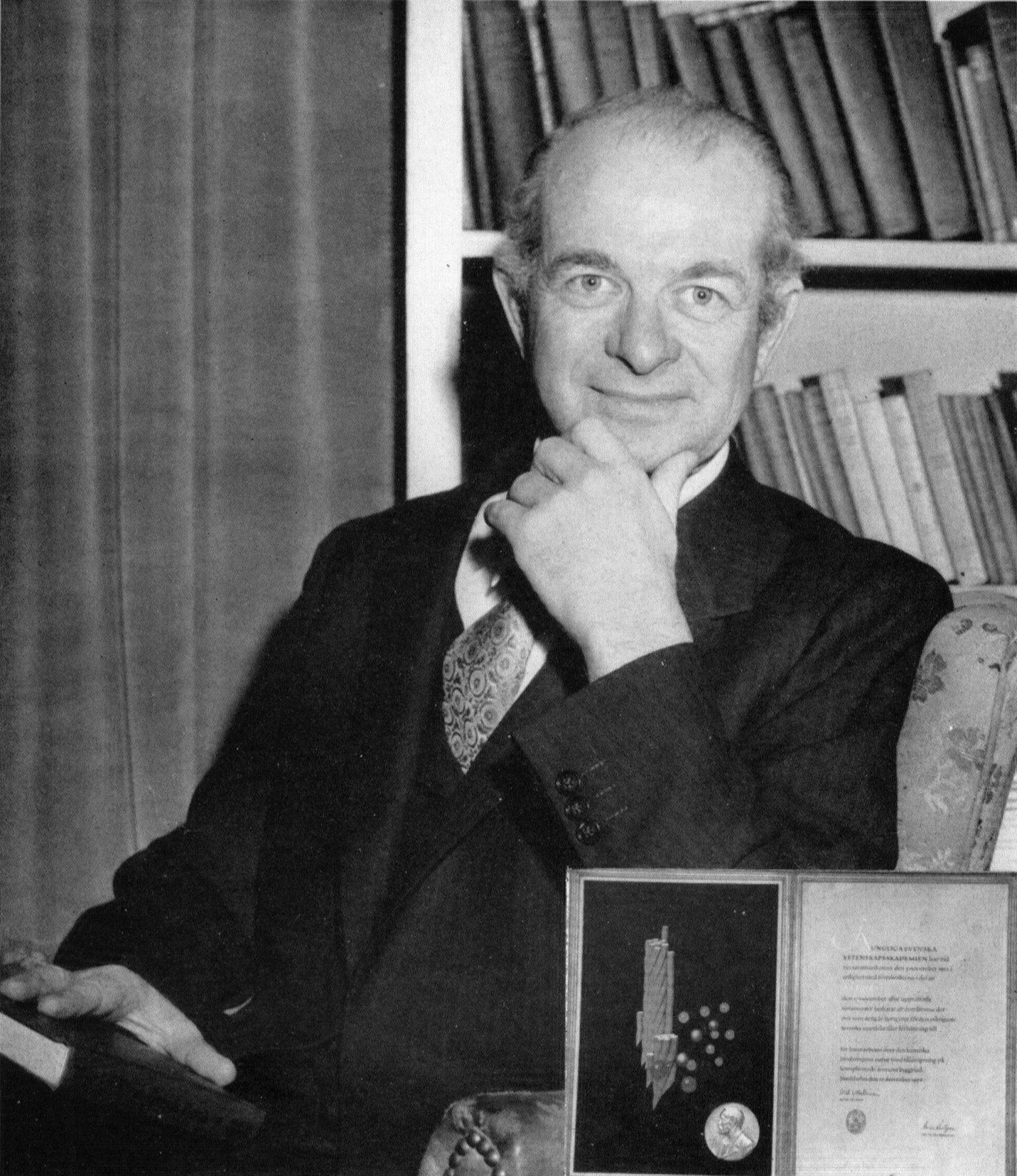
Linus Pauling with an inset of his Nobel Prize in 1955

In the late 1920s, Pauling began publishing papers on the nature of the chemical bond. Between 1937 and 1938, he took a position as George Fischer Baker Non-Resident Lecturer in Chemistry at Cornell University. While at Cornell, he delivered a series of nineteen lectures and completed the bulk of his famous textbook The Nature of the Chemical Bond. It is based primarily on his work in this area that he received the Nobel Prize in Chemistry in 1954 "for his research into the nature of the chemical bond and its application to the elucidation of the structure of complex substances". Pauling's book has been considered "chemistry's most influential book of this century and its effective bible". In the 30 years after its first edition was published in 1939, the book was cited more than 16,000 times. Even today, many modern scientific papers and articles in important journals cite this work, more than seventy years after the first publication.

Part of Pauling's work on the nature of the chemical bond led to his introduction of the concept of orbital hybridization. While it is normal to think of the electrons in an atom as being described by orbitals of types such as s and p, it turns out that in describing the bonding in molecules, it is better to construct functions that partake of some of the properties of each. Thus the one 2s and three 2p orbitals in a carbon atom can be (mathematically) 'mixed' or combined to make four equivalent orbitals (called sp^{3} hybrid orbitals), which would be the appropriate orbitals to describe carbon compounds such as methane, or the 2s orbital may be combined with two of the 2p orbitals to make three equivalent orbitals (called sp^{2} hybrid orbitals), with the remaining 2p orbital unhybridized, which would be the appropriate orbitals to describe certain unsaturated carbon compounds such as ethylene. Other hybridization schemes are also found in other types of molecules. Another area which he explored was the relationship between ionic bonding, where electrons are transferred between atoms, and covalent bonding, where electrons are shared between atoms on an equal basis. Pauling showed that these were merely extremes, and that for most actual cases of bonding, the quantum-mechanical wave function for a polar molecule AB is a combination of wave functions for covalent and ionic molecules. Here Pauling's electronegativity concept is particularly useful; the electronegativity difference between a pair of atoms will be the surest predictor of the degree of ionicity of the bond.

The third of the topics that Pauling attacked under the overall heading of "the nature of the chemical bond" was the accounting of the structure of aromatic hydrocarbons, particularly the prototype, benzene. The best description of benzene had been made by the German chemist August Kekulé. He had treated it as a rapid interconversion between two structures, each with alternating single and double bonds, but with the double bonds of one structure in the locations where the single bonds were in the other. Pauling showed that a proper description based on quantum mechanics was an intermediate structure which was a blend of each. The structure was a quantum superposition of structures rather than a rapid interconversion between them. The name "resonance" was later applied to this phenomenon.

=== Ionic crystal structures ===
In 1929, Pauling published five rules which help to predict and explain crystal structures of ionic compounds. These rules concern (1) the ratio of cation radius to anion radius, (2) the electrostatic bond strength, (3) the sharing of polyhedron corners, edges and faces, (4) crystals containing different cations, and (5) the rule of parsimony.

=== Biological molecules ===
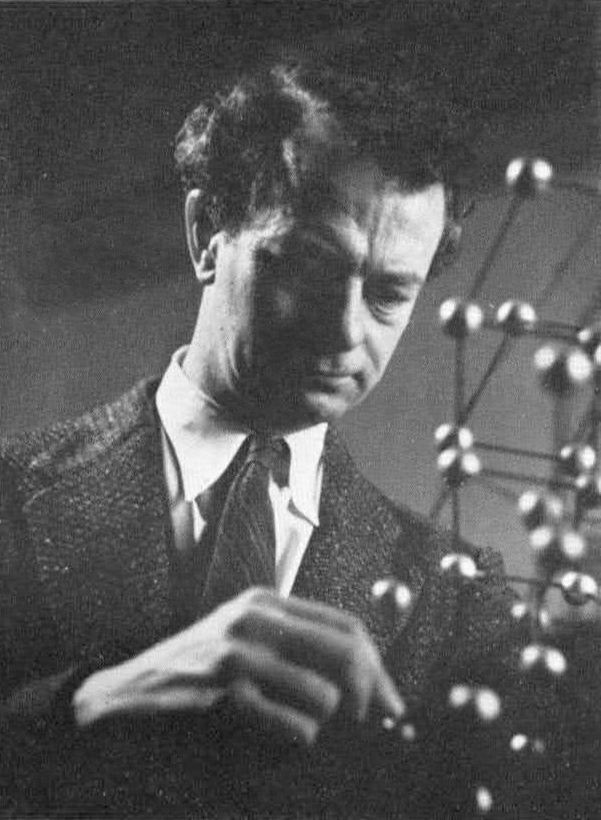
Pauling in 1941

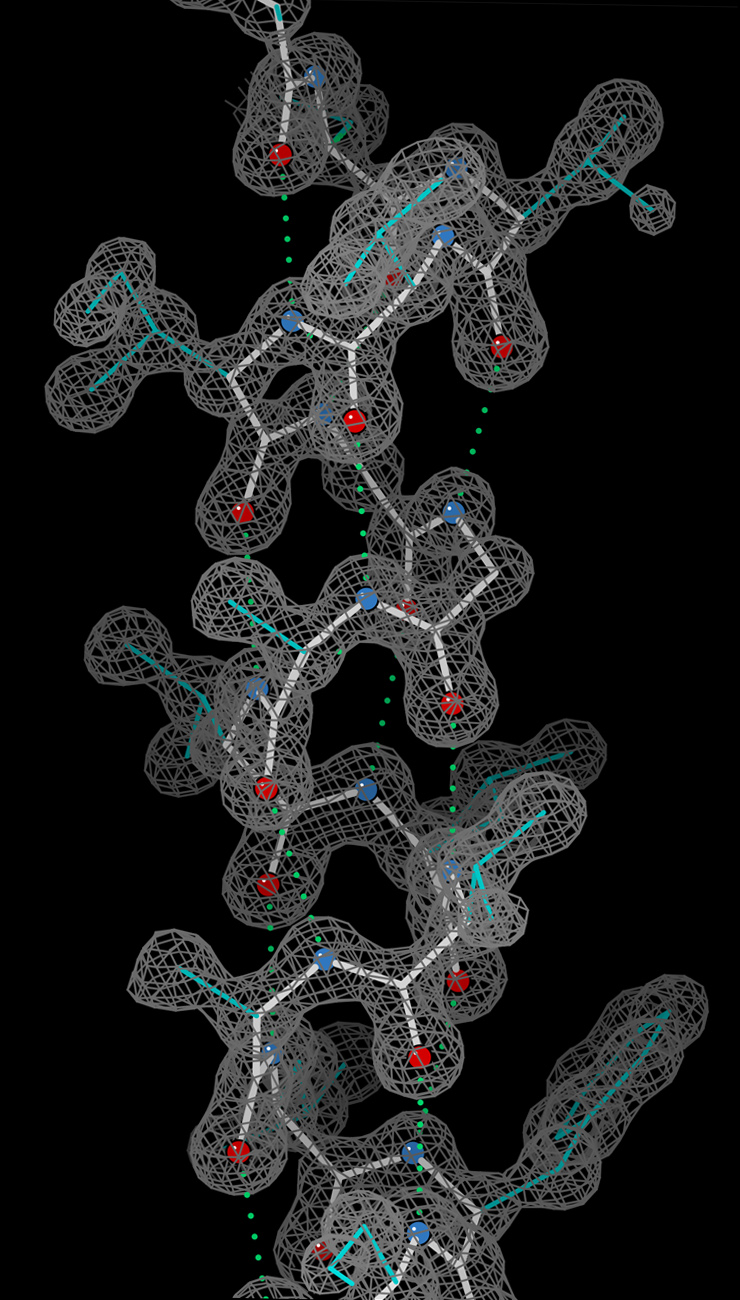
An alpha helix in ultra-high-resolution electron density contours, with O atoms in red, N atoms in blue, and hydrogen bonds as green dotted lines (PDB file 2NRL, 17–32)

In the mid-1930s, Pauling, strongly influenced by the biologically oriented funding priorities of the Rockefeller Foundation's Warren Weaver, decided to strike out into new areas of interest. Although Pauling's early interest had focused almost exclusively on inorganic molecular structures, he had occasionally thought about molecules of biological importance, in part because of Caltech's growing strength in biology. Pauling interacted with such great biologists as Thomas Hunt Morgan, Theodosius Dobzhanski, Calvin Bridges and Alfred Sturtevant. His early work in this area included studies of the structure of hemoglobin with his student Charles D. Coryell. He demonstrated that the hemoglobin molecule changes structure when it gains or loses an oxygen molecule. As a result of this observation, he decided to conduct a more thorough study of protein structure in general. He returned to his earlier use of X-ray diffraction analysis. But protein structures were far less amenable to this technique than the crystalline minerals of his former work. The best X-ray pictures of proteins in the 1930s had been made by the British crystallographer William Astbury, but when Pauling tried, in 1937, to account for Astbury's observations quantum mechanically, he could not.

It took eleven years for Pauling to explain the problem: his mathematical analysis was correct, but Astbury's pictures were taken in such a way that the protein molecules were tilted from their expected positions. Pauling had formulated a model for the structure of hemoglobin in which atoms were arranged in a helical pattern, and applied this idea to proteins in general.

In 1951, based on the structures of amino acids and peptides and the planar nature of the peptide bond, Pauling, Robert Corey and Herman Branson correctly proposed the alpha helix and beta sheet as the primary structural motifs in protein secondary structure. This work exemplified Pauling's ability to think unconventionally; central to the structure was the unorthodox assumption that one turn of the helix may well contain a non-integer number of amino acid residues; for the alpha helix it is 3.7 amino acid residues per turn.

Pauling then proposed that deoxyribonucleic acid (DNA) was a triple helix; his model contained several basic mistakes, including a proposal of neutral phosphate groups, an idea that conflicted with the acidity of DNA. Sir Lawrence Bragg had been disappointed that Pauling had won the race to find the alpha helix structure of proteins. Bragg's team had made a fundamental error in making their models of protein by not recognizing the planar nature of the peptide bond. When it was learned at the Cavendish Laboratory that Pauling was working on molecular models of the structure of DNA, James Watson and Francis Crick were allowed to make a molecular model of DNA. They later benefited from unpublished data from Maurice Wilkins and Rosalind Franklin at King's College which showed evidence for a helix and planar base stacking along the helix axis. Early in 1953 Watson and Crick proposed a correct structure for the DNA double helix. Pauling later cited several reasons to explain how he had been misled about the structure of DNA, among them misleading density data and the lack of high quality X-ray diffraction photographs. Pauling described this situation as "the biggest disappointment in his life".

During the time Pauling was researching the problem, Rosalind Franklin in England was creating the world's best images. They were key to Watson's and Crick's success. Pauling did not see them before devising his mistaken DNA structure, although his assistant Robert Corey did see at least some of them, while taking Pauling's place at a may 1952 protein conference in England. Pauling had been prevented from attending because his passport was withheld by the State Department on suspicion that he had Communist sympathies. This led to the legend that Pauling missed the structure of DNA because of the politics of the day (this was at the start of the McCarthy period in the United States). Politics did not play a critical role. Not only did Corey see the images at the time, but Pauling himself regained his passport within a few weeks and toured English laboratories well before writing his DNA paper. He had ample opportunity to visit Franklin's lab and see her work, but chose not to. Despite these times, Pauling chose to move on from them and be thankful for the discoveries that he had already found.

Pauling also studied enzyme reactions and was among the first to point out that enzymes bring about reactions by stabilizing the transition state of the reaction, a view which is central to understanding their mechanism of action. He was also among the first scientists to postulate that the binding of antibodies to antigens would be due to a complementarity between their structures. Along the same lines, with the physicist turned biologist Max Delbrück, he wrote an early paper arguing that DNA replication was likely to be due to complementarity, rather than similarity, as suggested by a few researchers. This was made clear in the model of the structure of DNA that Watson and Crick discovered.

=== Molecular genetics ===
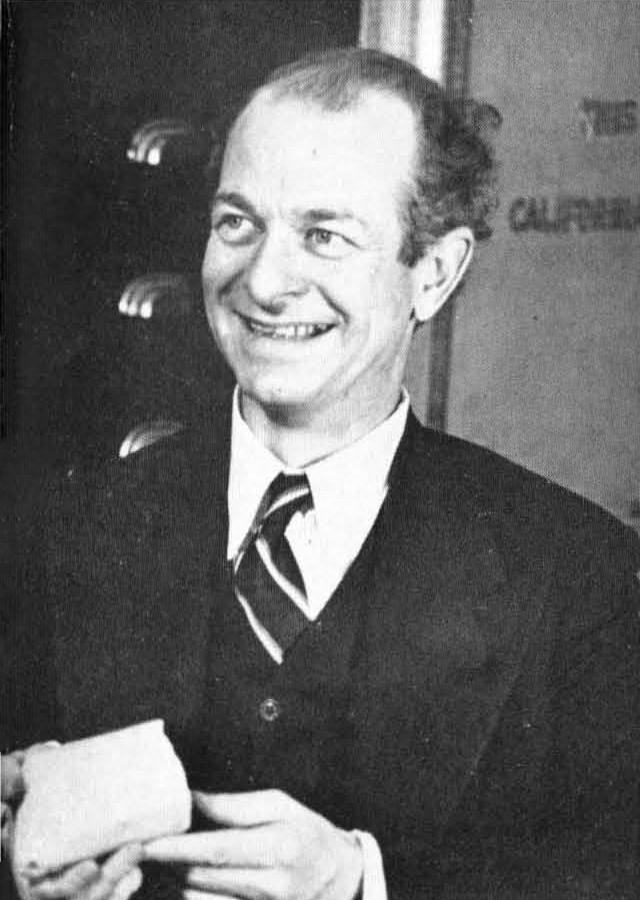
Pauling in 1948

In November 1949, Pauling, Harvey Itano, S. J. Singer and Ibert Wells published "Sickle Cell Anemia, a Molecular Disease" in the journal Science. It was the first proof of a human disease being caused by an abnormal protein, and sickle cell anemia became the first disease understood at the molecular level. (It was not, however, the first demonstration that variant forms of hemoglobin could be distinguished by electrophoresis, which had been shown several years earlier by Maud Menten and collaborators). Using electrophoresis, they demonstrated that individuals with sickle cell disease have a modified form of hemoglobin in their red blood cells, and that individuals with sickle cell trait have both the normal and abnormal forms of hemoglobin. This was the first demonstration causally linking an abnormal protein to a disease, and also the first demonstration that Mendelian inheritance determines the specific physical properties of proteins, not simply their presence or absence – the dawn of molecular genetics.

His success with sickle cell anemia led Pauling to speculate that a number of other diseases, including mental illnesses such as schizophrenia, might result from flawed genetics. As chairman of the Division of Chemistry and Chemical Engineering and director of the Gates and Crellin Chemical Laboratories, he encouraged the hiring of researchers with a chemical-biomedical approach to mental illness, a direction not always popular with established Caltech chemists.

In 1951, Pauling gave a lecture entitled "Molecular Medicine". In the late 1950s, he studied the role of enzymes in brain function, believing that mental illness may be partly caused by enzyme dysfunction. In the 1960s, as part of his interest in the effects of nuclear weapons, he investigated the role of mutations in evolution, proposing with his student Emile Zuckerkandl, the molecular evolutionary clock, the idea that mutations in proteins and DNA accumulate at a constant rate over time .

=== Structure of the atomic nucleus ===
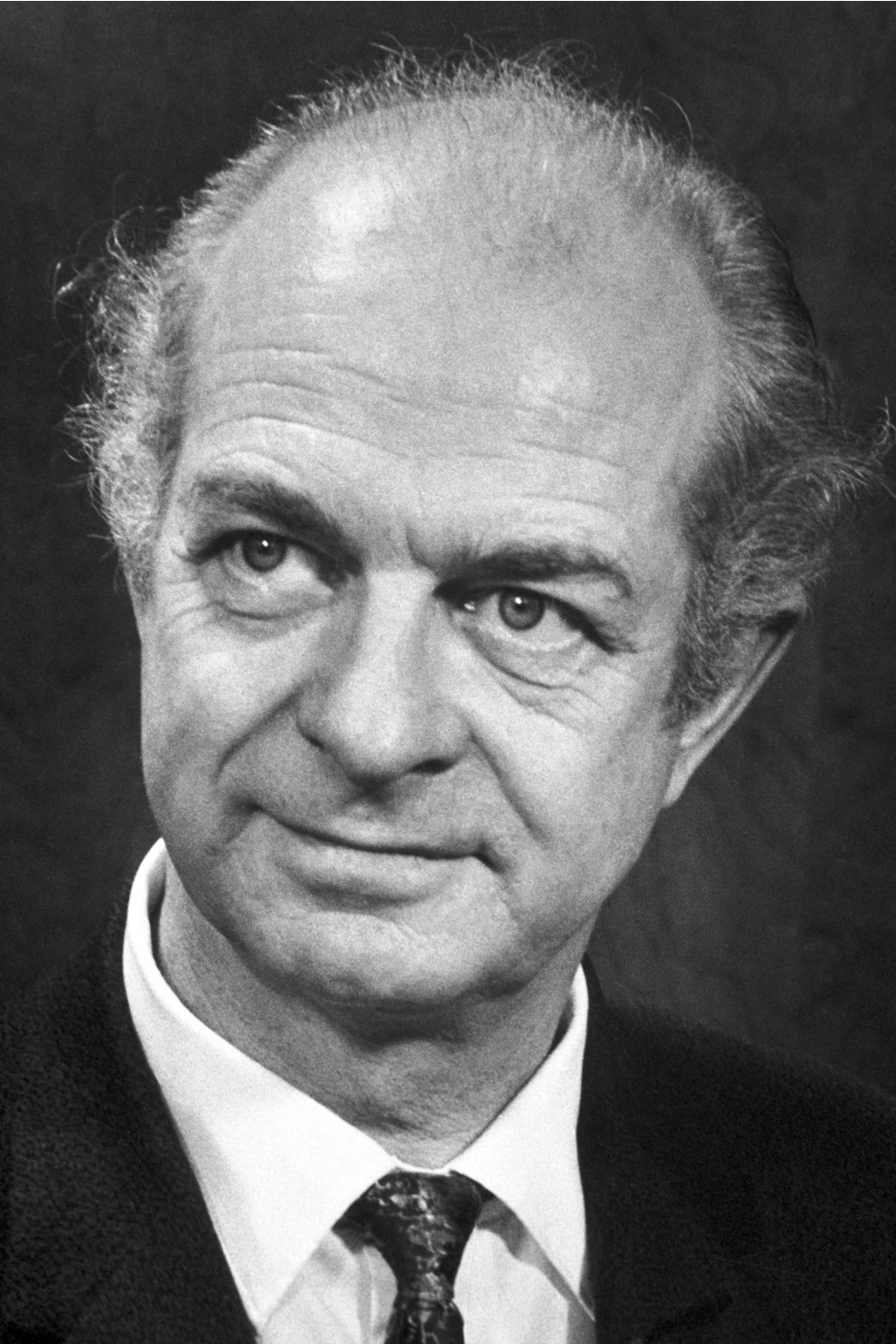
Pauling in 1962

On September 16, 1952, Pauling opened a new research notebook with the words "I have decided to attack the problem of the structure of nuclei." On October 15, 1965, Pauling published his Close-Packed Spheron Model of the atomic nucleus in two well respected journals, Science and the Proceedings of the National Academy of Sciences. For nearly three decades, until his death in 1994, Pauling published numerous papers on his spheron cluster model.

The basic idea behind Pauling's spheron model is that a nucleus can be viewed as a set of "clusters of nucleons". The basic nucleon clusters include the deuteron [np], helion [pnp], and triton [npn]. Even–even nuclei are described as being composed of clusters of alpha particles, as has often been done for light nuclei. Pauling attempted to derive the shell structure of nuclei from pure geometrical considerations related to Platonic solids rather than starting from an independent particle model as in the usual shell model. In an interview given in 1990 Pauling commented on his model:

Now recently, I have been trying to determine detailed structures of atomic nuclei by analyzing the ground state and excited state vibrational bends, as observed experimentally. From reading the physics literature, Physical Review Letters and other journals, I know that many physicists are interested in atomic nuclei, but none of them, so far as I have been able to discover, has been attacking the problem in the same way that I attack it. So I just move along at my own speed, making calculations ...

== Activism ==
=== Wartime work ===
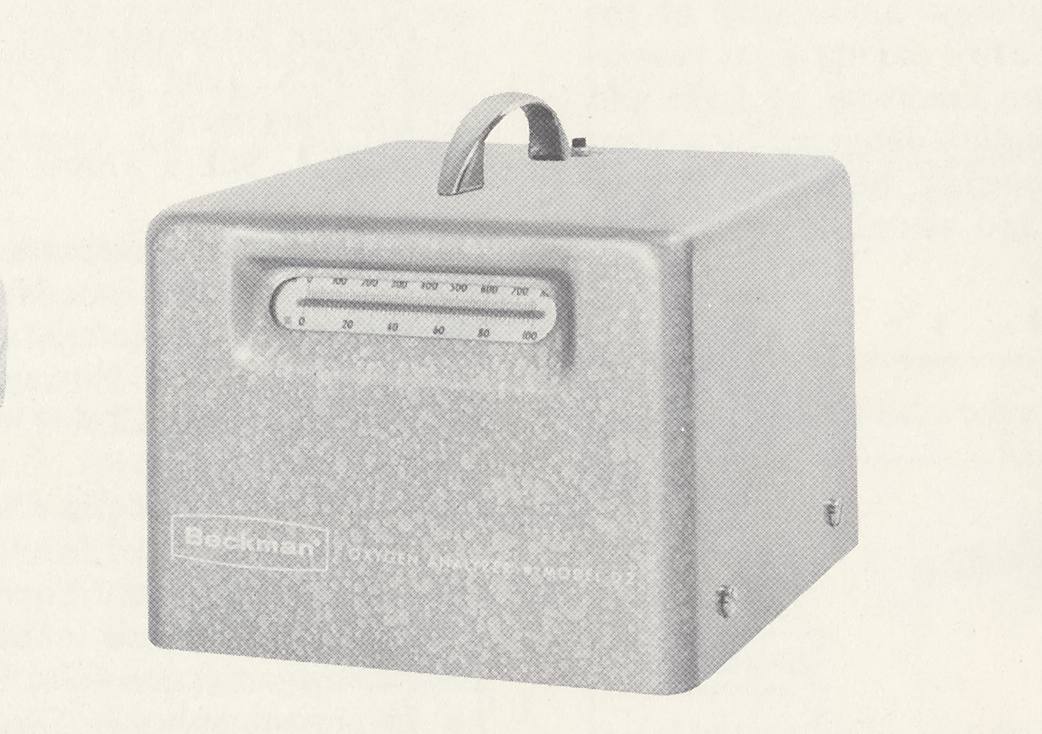
Beckman D2 Oxygen Analyzer, ca. 1950

Pauling had been practically apolitical until World War II. At the beginning of the Manhattan Project, Robert Oppenheimer invited him to be in charge of the Chemistry division of the project. He declined, not wanting to uproot his family.

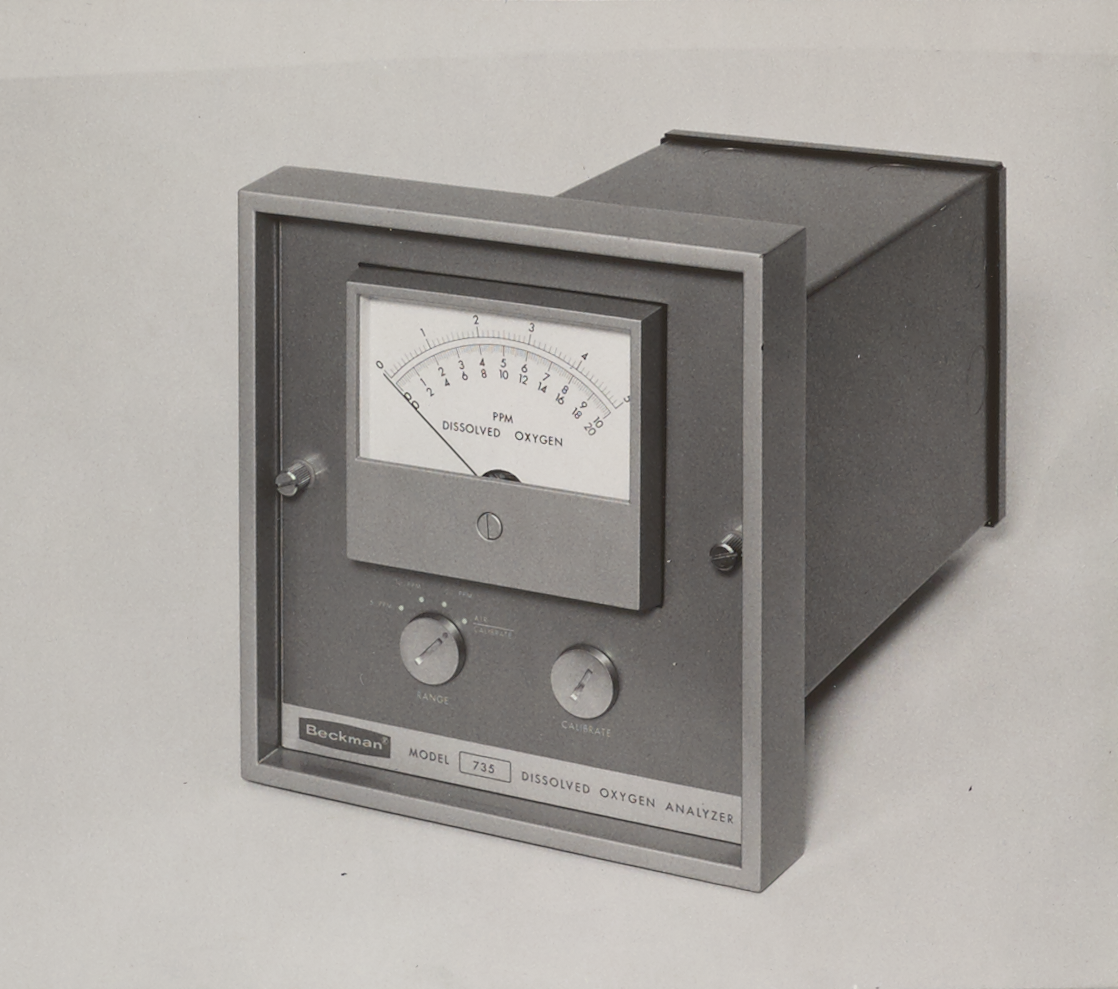
Beckman Model 735 Dissolved O_{2} Analyzer, later model based on Pauling's design, 1968

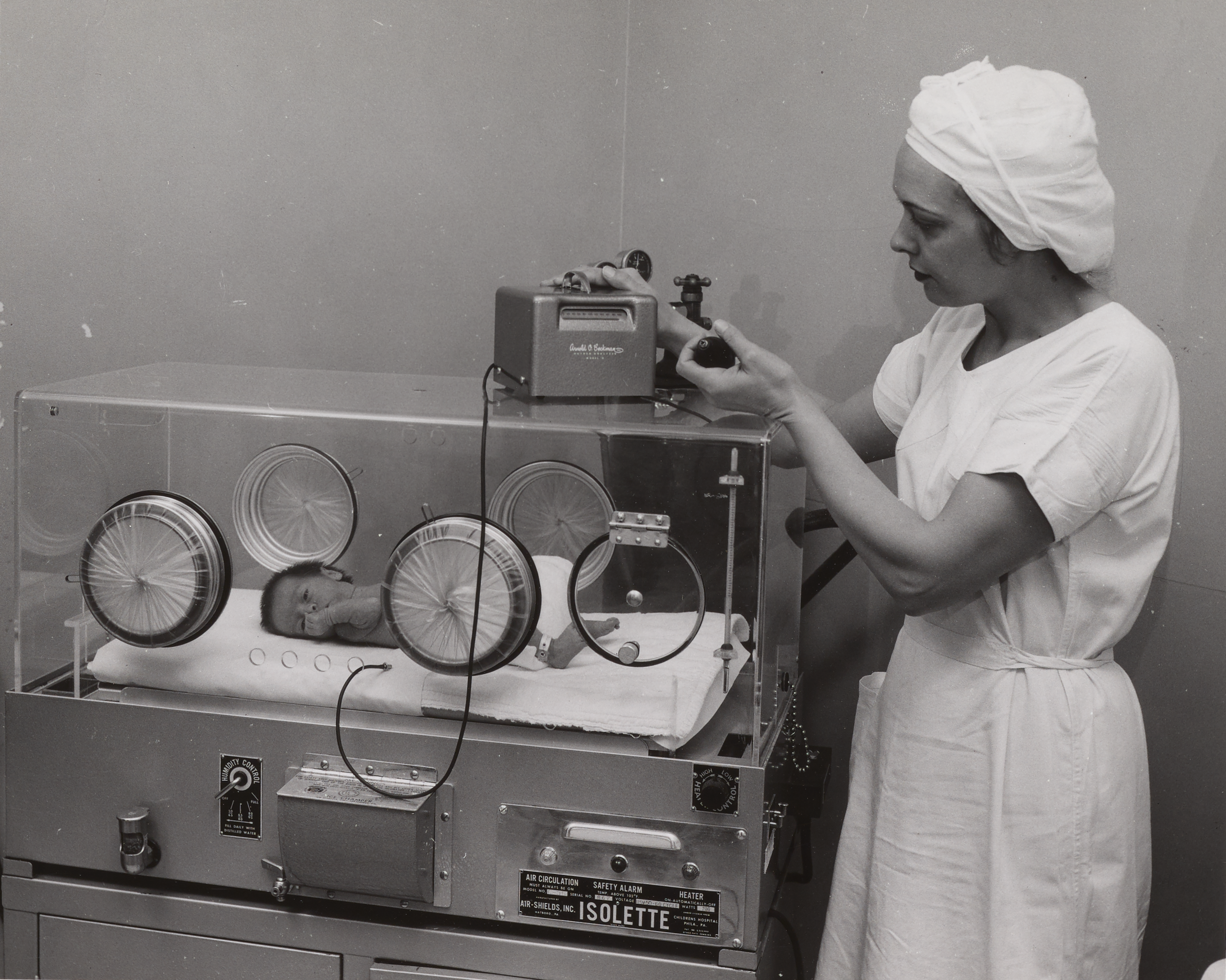
Beckman Model D Oxygen Meter, based on Pauling's design, with infant incubator, 1959

Pauling did, however, work on research for the military. He was a principal investigator on 14 OSRD contracts. The National Defense Research Committee called a meeting on October 3, 1940, wanting an instrument that could reliably measure oxygen content in a mixture of gases, so that they could measure oxygen conditions in submarines and airplanes. In response Pauling designed the Pauling oxygen meter, which was developed and manufactured by Arnold O. Beckman, Inc. After the war, Beckman adapted the oxygen analyzers for use in incubators for premature babies.

In 1942, Pauling successfully submitted a proposal on "The Chemical Treatment of Protein Solutions in the Attempt to Find a Substitute for Human Serum for Transfusions". His project group, which included Joseph B. Koepfli and Dan H. Campbell, developed a possible replacement for human blood plasma in transfusions: polyoxy gelatin (Oxypolygelatin).

Other wartime projects with more direct military applications included work on explosives, rocket propellants and the patent for an armor-piercing shell. In October 1948, Pauling, along with Lee A. DuBridge, William A. Fowler, Max Mason, and Bruce H. Sage, was awarded a Presidential Medal for Merit by President Harry S. Truman. The citation credits him for his "imaginative mind", "brilliant success", and "exceptionally meritorious conduct in the performance of outstanding services". In 1949, he served as president of the American Chemical Society.

=== Nuclear activism ===
The aftermath of the Manhattan Project and his wife Ava's pacifism changed Pauling's life profoundly, and he became a peace activist.

In June 1945, a "May-Johnson Bill" began that would become the Atomic Energy Act of 1946 (signed August 1, 1946). In November 1945, Pauling spoke to the Independent Citizens Committee of the Arts, Sciences and Professions (ICCASP) on atomic weapons; shortly after, wife Ava and he accepted membership. On January 21, 1946, the group met to discuss academic freedom, during which Pauling said, "There is, of course, always a threat to academic freedom – as there is to the other aspects of the freedom and rights of the individual, in the continued attacks which are made on this freedom, these rights, by the selfish, the overly ambitious, the misguided, the unscrupulous, who seek to oppress the great body of mankind in order that they themselves may profit – and we must always be on the alert against this threat, and must fight it with vigor when it becomes dangerous."

In 1946, he joined the Emergency Committee of Atomic Scientists, chaired by Albert Einstein. Its mission was to warn the public of the dangers associated with the development of nuclear weapons.

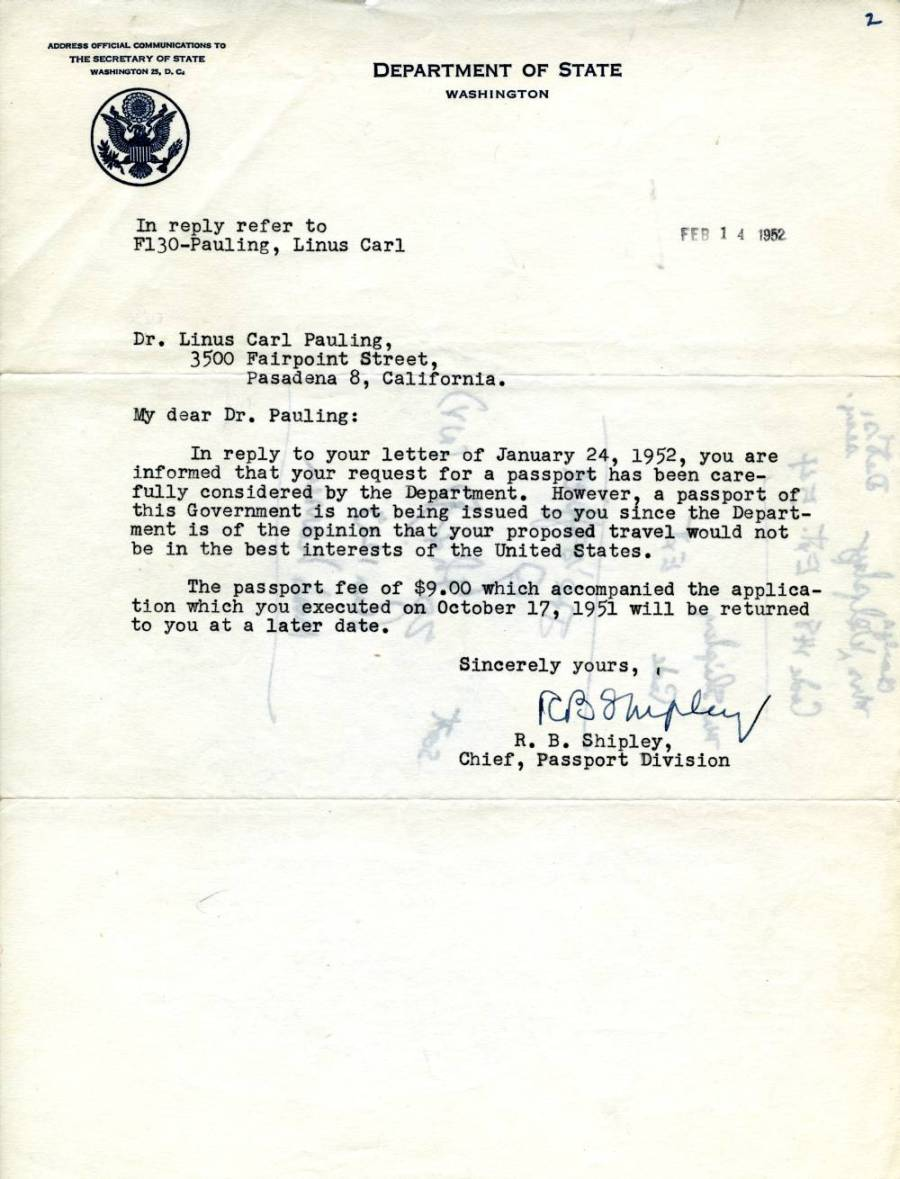
Denial letter from Ruth B. Shipley, Chief Passport Division, Department of State to Linus Pauling on February 14, 1952

His political activism prompted the US State Department to deny him a passport in 1952, when he was invited to speak at a scientific conference in London. In a speech before the US Senate on June 6 of the same year, Senator Wayne Morse publicly denounced the action of the State Department, and urged the Passport Division to reverse its decision. Pauling and his wife Ava were then issued a "limited passport" to attend the conference. His full passport was restored in 1954, shortly before the ceremony in Stockholm where he received his first Nobel Prize.

Joining Einstein, Bertrand Russell and eight other leading scientists and intellectuals, he signed the Russell-Einstein Manifesto issued July 9, 1955. He also supported the Mainau Declaration of July 15, 1955, signed by 52 Nobel Prize laureates.

In May 1957, working with Washington University in St. Louis professor Barry Commoner, Pauling began to circulate a petition among scientists to stop nuclear testing. On January 15, 1958, Pauling and his wife presented a petition to United Nations Secretary General Dag Hammarskjöld calling for an end to the testing of nuclear weapons. It was signed by 11,021 scientists representing fifty countries.

In February 1958, Pauling participated in a publicly televised debate with the atomic physicist Edward Teller about the actual probability of fallout causing mutations. Later in 1958, Pauling published No more war!, in which he not only called for an end to the testing of nuclear weapons but also an end to war itself. He proposed that a World Peace Research Organization be set up as part of the United Nations to "attack the problem of preserving the peace".

Pauling also supported the work of the St. Louis Citizen's Committee for Nuclear Information (CNI). This group, headed by Barry Commoner, Eric Reiss, M. W. Friedlander and John Fowler, organized a longitudinal study to measure radioactive strontium-90 in the baby teeth of children across North America. The "Baby Tooth Survey", published by Louise Reiss, demonstrated conclusively in 1961 that above-ground nuclear testing posed significant public health risks in the form of radioactive fallout spread primarily via milk from cows that had ingested contaminated grass. The Committee for Nuclear Information is frequently credited for its significant contribution to supporting the test ban, as is the ground-breaking research conducted by Reiss and the "Baby Tooth Survey".

Public pressure and the frightening results of the CNI research led to a moratorium on above-ground nuclear weapons testing, followed by the Partial Test Ban Treaty, signed in 1963 by John F. Kennedy and Nikita Khrushchev. On the day that the treaty went into force, October 10, 1963, the Nobel Prize Committee awarded Pauling the Nobel Peace Prize for 1962. (No prize had previously been awarded for that year.) They described him as "Linus Carl Pauling, who ever since 1946 has campaigned ceaselessly, not only against nuclear weapons tests, not only against the spread of these armaments, not only against their very use, but against all warfare as a means of solving international conflicts." Pauling himself acknowledged his wife Ava's deep involvement in peace work, and regretted that she was not awarded the Nobel Peace Prize with him.

=== Political criticism ===
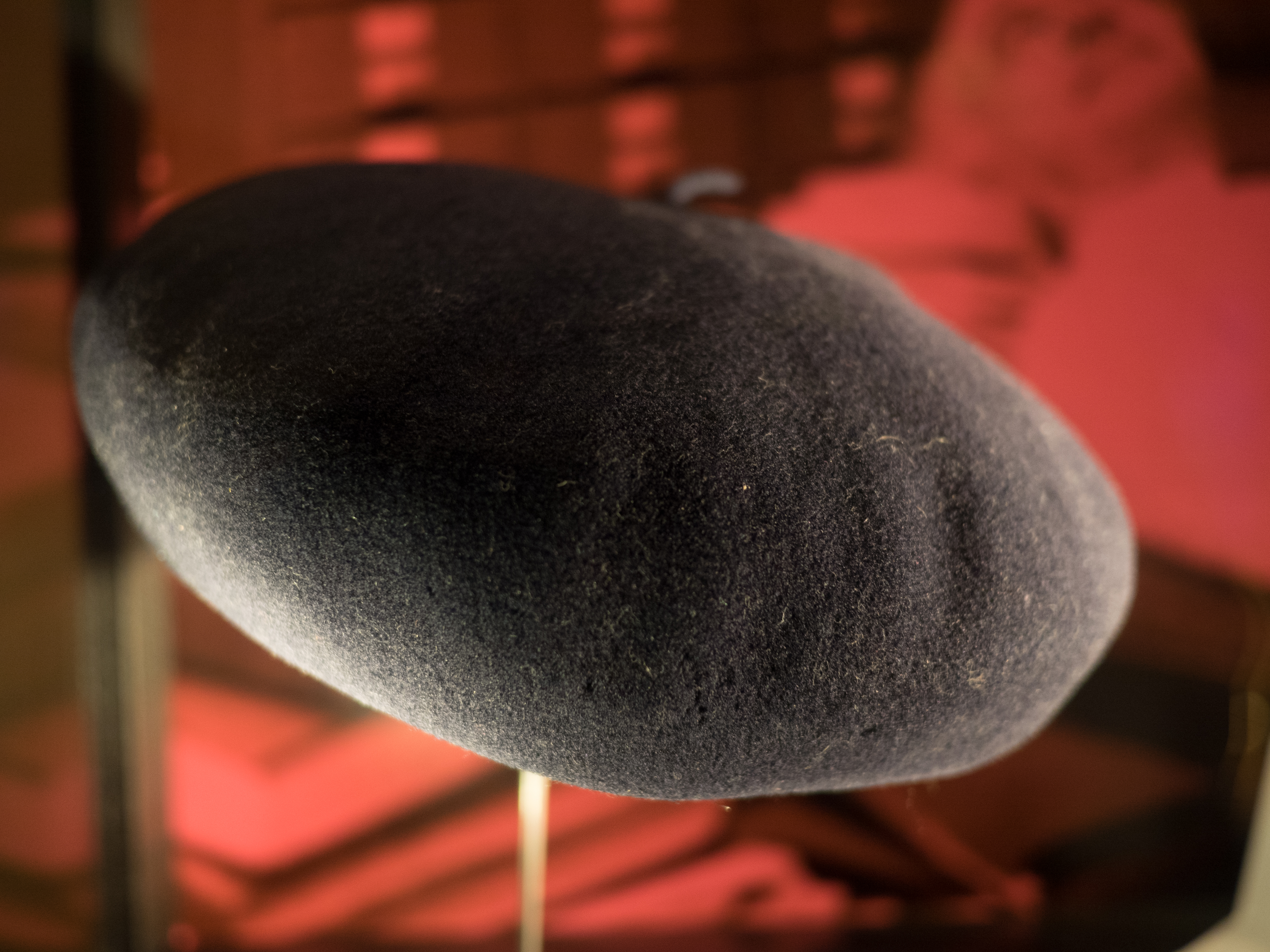
Pauling's beret on display at the Nobel Prize Museum

Many of Pauling's critics, including scientists who appreciated the contributions that he had made in chemistry, disagreed with his political positions and saw him as a naïve spokesman for Soviet communism. In 1960, he was ordered to appear before the Senate Internal Security Subcommittee, which termed him "the number one scientific name in virtually every major activity of the Communist peace offensive in this country". A headline in Life magazine characterized his 1962 Nobel Prize as "A Weird Insult from Norway".

Pauling was a frequent target of the National Review magazine. In an article entitled "The Collaborators" in the magazine's July 17, 1962, issue, Pauling was referred to not only as a collaborator, but as a "fellow traveler" of proponents of Soviet-style communism. In 1963, Pauling sued the magazine, its publisher William Rusher, and its editor William F. Buckley, Jr for $1 million. He lost both his libel suits and the 1968 appeal (unlike his earlier 1963 libel case against the Hearst Corporation), because in the meantime the landmark case New York Times Co. v. Sullivan had established the actual malice standard for libel lawsuits by public figures, requiring that not only falsehood but deliberate lying should be proved by the plaintiff in such cases.

His peace activism, his frequent travels, and his enthusiastic expansion into chemical-biomedical research all aroused opposition at Caltech. In 1958, the Caltech Board of Trustees demanded that Pauling step down as chairman of the Chemistry and Chemical Engineering Division. Although he had retained tenure as a full professor, Pauling chose to resign from Caltech after he received the Nobel peace prize money. He spent the next three years at the Center for the Study of Democratic Institutions (1963–1967). In 1967, he moved to the University of California at San Diego, but remained there only briefly, leaving in 1969 in part because of political tensions with the Reagan-era board of regents. From 1969 to 1974, he accepted a position as professor of chemistry at Stanford University.

=== Vietnam war activism ===
During the 1960s, President Lyndon B. Johnson's policy of increasing America's involvement in the Vietnam War caused an anti-war movement that the Paulings joined with enthusiasm. Pauling denounced the war as unnecessary and unconstitutional. He made speeches, signed protest letters and communicated personally with the North Vietnamese leader, Ho Chi Minh, and gave the lengthy written response to President Johnson. His efforts were ignored by the American government.

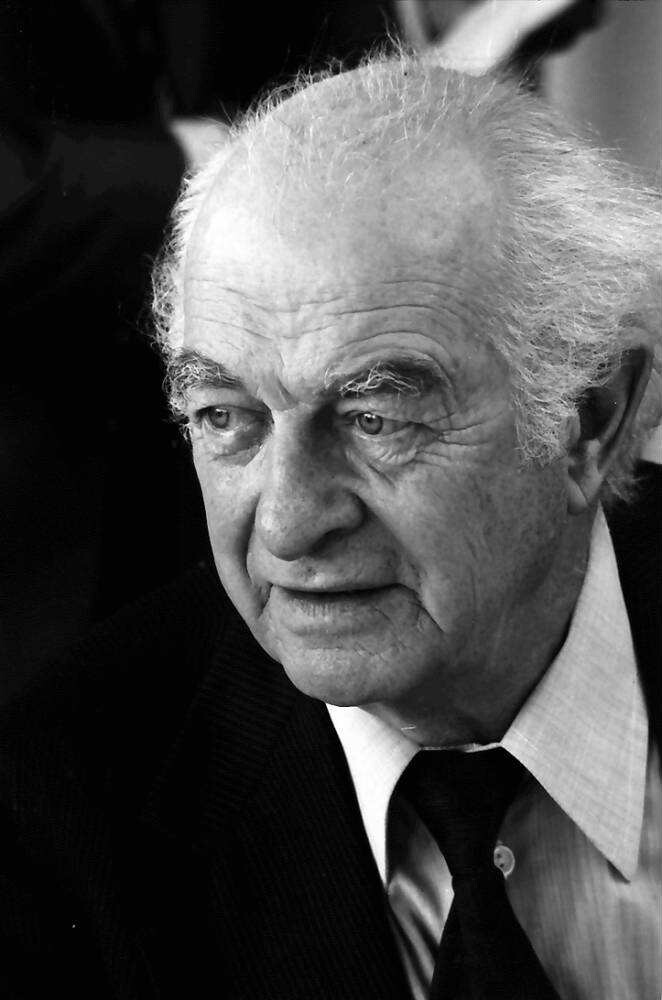
Pauling in 1977

Pauling was awarded the International Lenin Peace Prize by the USSR in 1970. He continued his peace activism in the following years. He and his wife Ava helped to found the International League of Humanists in 1974. He was president of the scientific advisory board of the World Union for Protection of Life and also one of the signatories of the Dubrovnik–Philadelphia statement of 1974/1976. Linus Carl Pauling was an honorary president and member of the International Academy of Science, Munich, until the end of his life.

Pauling was also a supporter of the Fair Play for Cuba Committee.

=== Global activism ===
He was one of the signatories of the agreement to convene a convention for drafting a world constitution. As a result, for the first time in human history, a World Constituent Assembly convened to draft and adopt a Constitution for the Federation of Earth.

=== Eugenics ===
Pauling supported a limited form of eugenics by suggesting that human carriers of defective genes be given a compulsory visible mark – such as a forehead tattoo – to discourage potential mates with the same defect, in order to reduce the number of babies with diseases such as sickle cell anemia.

=== Medical research and vitamin C advocacy ===
Pauling's book, How to Live Longer and Feel Better, advocated very high intake of Vitamin C.

In 1941, at age 40, Pauling was diagnosed with Bright's disease, a renal disease. Following the recommendations of Thomas Addis, who actively recruited Ava Helen Pauling as "nutritionist, cook, and eventually as deputy 'doctor'", Pauling believed he was able to control the disease with Addis's then-unusual low-protein salt-free diet and vitamin supplements. Thus Pauling's initial – and intensely personal – exposure to the idea of treating disease with vitamin supplements was positive.

In 1965, Pauling read Niacin Therapy in Psychiatry by Abram Hoffer and theorized vitamins might have important biochemical effects unrelated to their prevention of associated deficiency diseases. In 1968, Pauling published a brief paper in Science entitled "Orthomolecular psychiatry", giving a name to the popular but controversial megavitamin therapy movement of the 1970s, and advocating that "orthomolecular therapy, the provision for the individual person of the optimum concentrations of important normal constituents of the brain, may be the preferred treatment for many mentally ill patients." Pauling coined the term "orthomolecular" to refer to the practice of varying the concentration of substances normally present in the body to prevent and treat disease. His ideas formed the basis of orthomolecular medicine, which is not generally practiced by conventional medical professionals and has been strongly criticized.

In 1973, with Arthur B. Robinson and another colleague, Pauling founded the Institute of Orthomolecular Medicine in Menlo Park, California, which was soon renamed the Linus Pauling Institute of Science and Medicine. Pauling directed research on vitamin C, but also continued his theoretical work in chemistry and physics until his death. In his last years, he became especially interested in the possible role of vitamin C in preventing atherosclerosis and published three case reports on the use of lysine and vitamin C to relieve angina pectoris. During the 1990s, Pauling put forward a comprehensive plan for the treatment of heart disease using lysine and vitamin C. In 1996, a website was created expounding Pauling's treatment which it referred to as Pauling Therapy. Proponents of Pauling Therapy believe that heart disease can be treated and even cured using only lysine and Vitamin C and without drugs or heart operations.

Pauling's work on vitamin C in his later years generated much controversy. He was first introduced to the concept of high-dose vitamin C by biochemist Irwin Stone in 1966. After becoming convinced of its worth, Pauling took 3 grams of vitamin C every day to prevent colds. Excited by his own perceived results, he researched the clinical literature and published Vitamin C and the Common Cold in 1970. He began a long clinical collaboration with the British cancer surgeon Ewan Cameron in 1971 on the use of intravenous and oral vitamin C as cancer therapy for terminal patients. Cameron and Pauling wrote many technical papers and a popular book, Cancer and Vitamin C, that discussed their observations. Pauling made vitamin C popular with the public and eventually published two studies of a group of 100 allegedly terminal patients that claimed vitamin C increased survival by as much as four times compared to untreated patients.

A re-evaluation of the claims in 1982 found that the patient groups were not actually comparable, with the vitamin C group being less sick on entry to the study, and judged to be "terminal" much earlier than the comparison group. Later clinical trials conducted by the Mayo Clinic led by oncologist Dr. Edward T. Creagan also concluded that high-dose (10,000 mg) vitamin C was no better than placebo at treating cancer and that there was no benefit to high-dose vitamin C. The failure of the clinical trials to demonstrate any benefit resulted in the conclusion that vitamin C was not effective in treating cancer; the medical establishment concluded that his claims that vitamin C could prevent colds or treat cancer were quackery. Pauling denounced the conclusions of these studies and handling of the final study as "fraud and deliberate misrepresentation", and criticized the studies for using oral, rather than intravenous vitamin C (which was the dosing method used for the first ten days of Pauling's original study). Pauling also criticised the Mayo Clinic studies because the controls were taking vitamin C during the trial, and because the duration of the treatment with vitamin C was short; Pauling advocated continued high-dose vitamin C for the rest of the cancer patient's life whereas the Mayo Clinic patients in the second trial were treated with vitamin C for a median of 2.5 months.

Ultimately the negative findings of the Mayo Clinic studies ended general interest in vitamin C as a treatment for cancer. Despite this, Pauling continued to promote vitamin C for treating cancer and the common cold, working with The Institutes for the Achievement of Human Potential to use vitamin C in the treatment of brain-injured children. He later collaborated with the Canadian physician Abram Hoffer on a micronutrient regime, including high-dose vitamin C, as adjunctive cancer therapy. A 2009 review also noted differences between the studies, such as the Mayo Clinic not using intravenous Vitamin C, and suggested further studies into the role of vitamin C when given intravenously. Results from most clinical trials suggest that modest vitamin C supplementation alone or with other nutrients offers no benefit in the prevention of cancer.

== Personal life ==
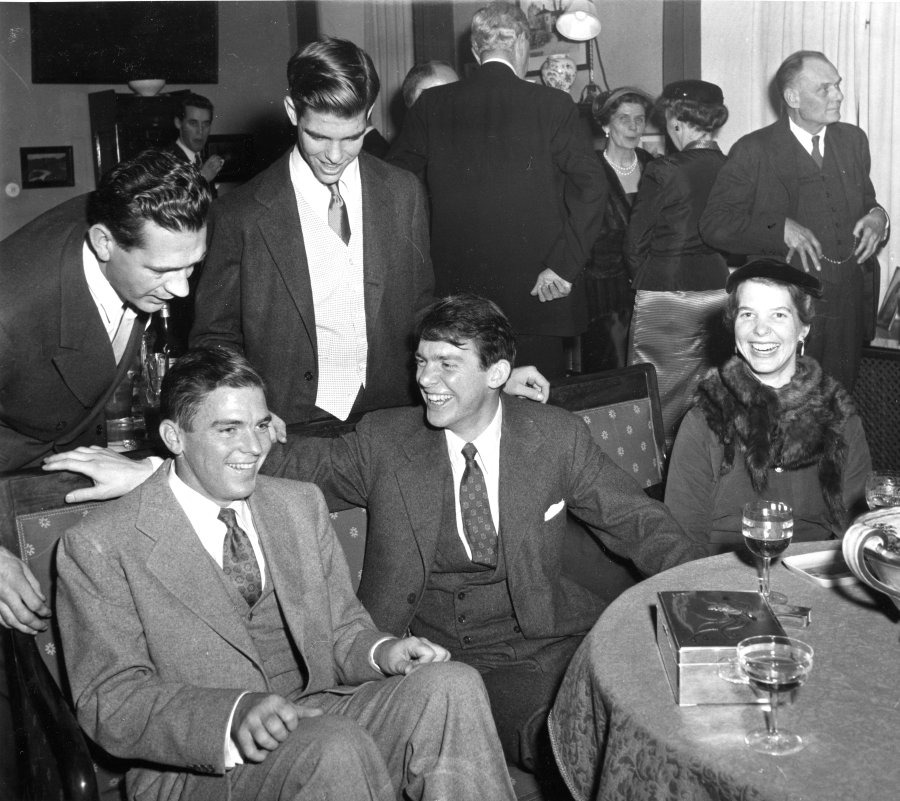
The Pauling children at a gathering in celebration of the 1954 Nobel Prizes in Stockholm, Sweden. Seated from left: Linus Pauling, Jr., Peter Pauling and Linda Pauling. Standing from left: an unidentified person, and Crellin Pauling

Pauling married Ava Helen Miller on June 17, 1923. The marriage lasted until her death in 1981. They had four children. Linus Carl Jr. (1925–2023) became a psychiatrist; Peter (1931–2003) a crystallographer at University College London; Edward Crellin (1937–1997) a biologist; and Linda Helen (born 1932) married noted Caltech geologist and glaciologist Barclay Kamb.

Pauling was raised as a member of the Lutheran Church, but later joined the Unitarian Universalist Church. Two years before his death, in a published dialogue with Buddhist philosopher Daisaku Ikeda, Pauling publicly declared his atheism.

On January 30, 1960, Pauling and his wife were using a cabin about 80 miles (130 km) south of Monterey, California, and he decided to go for a walk on a coastal trail. He got lost and tried to climb the rocky cliff, but reached a large overhanging rock about 300 feet (90 m) above the ocean. He decided it was safest to stay there, and meanwhile he was reported missing. He spent a sleepless night on the cliff before being found after almost 24 hours.

=== Death and legacy ===
Pauling died of prostate cancer on August 19, 1994, at 19:20 at home in Big Sur, California. He was 93 years old. A grave marker for Pauling was placed in Oswego Pioneer Cemetery in Lake Oswego, Oregon by his sister Pauline, but Pauling's ashes, along with those of his wife, were not buried there until 2005.

Pauling's discoveries led to decisive contributions in a diverse array of areas including around 350 publications in the fields of quantum mechanics, inorganic chemistry, organic chemistry, protein structure, molecular biology, and medicine.

His work on chemical bonding marks him as one of the founders of modern quantum chemistry. The Nature of the Chemical Bond was the standard work for many years, and concepts like hybridization and electronegativity remain part of standard chemistry textbooks. While his valence bond approach fell short of accounting quantitatively for some of the characteristics of molecules, such as the color of organometallic complexes, and would later be eclipsed by the molecular orbital theory of Robert Mulliken, valence bond theory still competes, in its modern form, with molecular orbital theory and density functional theory (DFT) as a way of describing chemical phenomena. Pauling's work on crystal structure contributed significantly to the prediction and elucidation of the structures of complex minerals and compounds. His discovery of the alpha helix and beta sheet is a fundamental foundation for the study of protein structure.

Francis Crick acknowledged Pauling as the "father of molecular biology". His discovery of sickle cell anemia as a "molecular disease" opened the way toward examining genetically acquired mutations at a molecular level.

Pauling's 1951 publication with Robert B. Corey and H. R. Branson, "The Structure of Proteins: Two Hydrogen-Bonded Helical Configurations of the Polypeptide Chain," was a key early finding in the then newly emerging field of molecular biology. This publication was honored by a Citation for Chemical Breakthrough Award from the Division of History of Chemistry of the American Chemical Society presented to the department of chemistry, Caltech, in 2017.

=== Commemorations ===
Oregon State University completed construction of the $77 million, 100,000-square-foot (9,300 m^{2}) Linus Pauling Science Center in the late 2000s, now housing the bulk of Oregon State's chemistry classrooms, labs, and instruments.

On March 6, 2008, the United States Postal Service released a 41 cent stamp honoring Pauling designed by artist Victor Stabin. His description reads: "A remarkably versatile scientist, structural chemist Linus Pauling (1901–1994) won the 1954 Nobel Prize in Chemistry for determining the nature of the chemical bond linking atoms into molecules. His work in establishing the field of molecular biology; his studies of hemoglobin led to the classification of sickle cell anemia as a molecular disease." The other scientists on this sheet of stamps included Gerty Cori, biochemist, Edwin Hubble, astronomer, and John Bardeen, physicist.

California Governor Arnold Schwarzenegger and First Lady Maria Shriver announced on May 28, 2008, that Pauling would be inducted into the California Hall of Fame, located at The California Museum for History, Women and the Arts. The induction ceremony took place December 15, 2008. Pauling's son Linus Jr. was asked to accept the honor in his place.

By proclamation of Gov. John Kitzhaber in the state of Oregon, February 28 has been named "Linus Pauling Day". The Linus Pauling Institute still exists, but moved in 1996 from Palo Alto, California, to Corvallis, Oregon, where it is part of the Linus Pauling Science Center at Oregon State University. The Valley Library Special Collections at Oregon State University contain the Ava Helen and Linus Pauling Papers, including digitized versions of Pauling's forty-six research notebooks.

In 1986, Caltech commemorated Linus Pauling with a symposium and lectureship. The Pauling Lecture series at Caltech began in 1989 with a lecture by Pauling himself. The Caltech Chemistry Department renamed room 22 of Gates Hall the Linus Pauling Lecture Hall, since Pauling spent so much time there.

Other places named after Pauling include Pauling Street in Foothill Ranch, California; Linus Pauling Drive in Hercules, California; Linus and Ava Helen Pauling Hall at Soka University of America in Aliso Viejo, California; Linus Pauling Middle School in Corvallis, Oregon; and Pauling Field, a small airfield located in Condon, Oregon, where Pauling spent his youth. There is a psychedelic rock band in Houston, Texas, named The Linus Pauling Quartet.

The asteroid 4674 Pauling in the inner asteroid belt, discovered by Eleanor F. Helin, was named after Linus Pauling in 1991, on his 90th birthday.

Linus Torvalds, developer of the Linux kernel, and Linus Sebastian, YouTuber known for the technology-oriented channel Linus Tech Tips, are named after Pauling.

Nobel laureate Peter Agre has said that Linus Pauling inspired him.

In 2010, Pacific Northwest National Laboratory named its distinguished postdoctoral program in his honor, as the Linus Pauling Distinguished Postdoctoral Fellowship Program.

== Honors and awards ==
Pauling received numerous honorary degrees (around 47 by his death), starting with his alma mater in 1933, and including prestigious institutions like Cambridge University, Oxford University, Princeton University, Reed College, and Yale University.

Awards and honors received during his career include the following:

- 1931 ACS Award in Pure Chemistry
- 1931 Irving Langmuir Award, American Chemical Society.
- 1933 Elected Member of the United States National Academy of Sciences
- 1936 Elected Member of the United States American Philosophical Society
- 1940 Alpha Chi Sigma, professional chemistry fraternity.
- 1941 Nichols Medal, New York Section, American Chemical Society.
- 1944 Elected Member of the American Academy of Arts and Sciences
- 1946 Willard Gibbs Award, Chicago section of the American Chemical Society.
- 1947 Davy Medal, Royal Society.
- 1947 T. W. Richards Medal, Northeastern Section of the American Chemical Society.
- 1948 Presidential Medal for Merit by President Harry S. Truman of the United States.
- 1948 Elected a Foreign Member of the Royal Society of London (ForMemRS)
- 1951 Gilbert N. Lewis medal, California section of the American Chemical Society.
- 1952 Pasteur Medal, Biochemical Society of France.
- 1954 Nobel Prize in Chemistry.
- 1955 Addis Medal, National Nephrosis Foundation.
- 1955 John Phillips Memorial Award, American College of Physicians.
- 1956 Avogadro Medal, Italian Academy of Science.
- 1957 Paul Sabatier Medal.
- 1957 Pierre Fermat Medal in Mathematics (awarded for only the sixth time in three centuries).
- 1957 International Grotius Medal.
- 1959 Messenger Lectureship
- 1960 Fellow, Royal Society of Arts
- 1961 Humanist of the Year, American Humanist Association.
- 1961 Gandhi Peace Award by Promoting Enduring Peace.
- 1962 Nobel Peace Prize.
- 1965 Medal, Academy of the Rumanian People's Republic.
- 1966 Linus Pauling Award.
- 1966 Silver Medal, Institute of France.
- 1966 Supreme Peace Sponsor, World Fellowship of Religion.
- 1967 Washington A. Roebling Medal, Mineralogical Society of America.
- 1972 Lenin Peace Prize.
- 1974 National Medal of Science by President Gerald R. Ford of the United States.
- 1978 Lomonosov Gold Medal, Presidium of the Academy of the USSR.
- 1979 Gold Medal Honoree, National Institute of Social Sciences.
- 1979 NAS Award in Chemical Sciences, National Academy of Sciences.
- 1979 Golden Plate Award, American Academy of Achievement
- 1981 John K. Lattimer Award, American Urological Association.
- 1984 Priestley Medal, American Chemical Society.
- 1984 Award for Chemistry, Arthur M. Sackler Foundation.
- 1986 Lavoisier Medal by Fondation de la Maison de la Chimie.
- 1987 Award in Chemical Education, American Chemical Society.
- 1989 Vannevar Bush Award, National Science Board.
- 1990 Richard C. Tolman Medal, American Chemical Society Southern California Section.
- 1992 Daisaku Ikeda Medal, Soka Gakkai International

Posthumous:

- 2008 "American Scientists" U.S. postage stamp series, $0.41, for his sickle cell disease work.

== Publications ==
=== Books ===
- ——; Wilson, E. B. (1985) [Originally published in 1935]. Introduction to Quantum Mechanics with Applications to Chemistry. Reprinted by Dover Publications. ISBN 978-0-486-64871-2.
- —— (1939). The Nature of the Chemical Bond and the Structure of Molecules and Crystals. Cornell University Press.
- —— (1947). General Chemistry: An Introduction to Descriptive Chemistry and Modern Chemical Theory. Freeman. Greatly revised and expanded in 1947, 1953, and 1970. Reprinted by Dover Publications in 1988.
- —— (1950). College Chemistry: An Introductory Textbook of General Chemistry. Freeman. 2nd edition, 1955. 3rd edition, 1964.
- —— (1970) [Originally published in 1964]. The Architecture of Molecules. (Illustrated by Roger Hayward). San Francisco: W. H. Freeman and Company. ISBN 978-0-7167-0158-3.
  - Manuscript notes and typescripts (clear images)
- —— (1958). No more war!. Dodd, Mead & Co. ISBN 978-1-124-11966-3
- —— (1977). Vitamin C, the Common Cold and the Flu. Freeman. ISBN 978-0-7167-0360-0.
- —— (1987). How to Live Longer and Feel Better. Avon. ISBN 978-0-380-70289-3.
- Cameron, E.; —— (1993). Cancer and Vitamin C: A Discussion of the Nature, Causes, Prevention, and Treatment of Cancer With Special Reference to the Value of Vitamin C. Camino. ISBN 978-0-940159-21-1.
- —— (1998). Linus Pauling On Peace: A Scientist Speaks Out on Humanism and World Survival. Rising Star Press. ISBN 978-0-933670-03-7.
- Hoffer, Abram; —— (2004). Healing Cancer: Complementary Vitamin & Drug Treatments. Toronto: CCNM Press. ISBN 978-1-897025-11-6.
- Ikeda, Daisaku; —— (2008). A Lifelong Quest for Peace: A Dialogue. Richard L. Gage (ed., trans.). London: I. B. Tauris. ISBN 978-1-84511-889-1.

=== Journal articles ===
- —— (1927). "The Theoretical Prediction of the Physical Properties of Many-Electron Atoms and Ions. Mole Refraction, Diamagnetic Susceptibility, and Extension in Space". Proceedings of the Royal Society A: Mathematical, Physical and Engineering Sciences. 114 (767): 181–211. Bibcode:1927RSPSA.114..181P. doi:10.1098/rspa.1927.0035.
- —— (1929). "The Principles Determining the Structure of Complex Ionic Crystals". Journal of the American Chemical Society. 51 (4): 1010–1026. Bibcode:1929JAChS..51.1010P. doi:10.1021/ja01379a006.
- —— (1931). "The Nature of the Chemical Bond. I. Application of Results Obtained from the Quantum Mechanics and from a Theory of Paramagnetic Susceptibility to the Structure of Molecules". Journal of the American Chemical Society. 53 (4): 1367–1400. Bibcode:1931JAChS..53.1367P. doi:10.1021/ja01355a027.
- —— (1931). "The Nature of the Chemical Bond. II. The One-Electron Bond and the Three-Electron Bond". Journal of the American Chemical Society. 53 (9): 3225–3237. Bibcode:1931JAChS..53.3225P. doi:10.1021/ja01360a004.
- —— (1932). "The Nature of the Chemical Bond. III. The Transition from One Extreme Bond Type to Another". Journal of the American Chemical Society. 54 (3): 988–1003. Bibcode:1932JAChS..54..988P. doi:10.1021/ja01342a022.
- —— (1932). "The Nature of the Chemical Bond. IV. The Energy of Single Bonds and the Relative Electronegativity of Atoms". Journal of the American Chemical Society. 54 (9): 3570–3582. Bibcode:1932JAChS..54.3570P. doi:10.1021/ja01348a011.
- ——; Wheland, G. W. (1933). "The Nature of the Chemical Bond. V. The Quantum-Mechanical Calculation of the Resonance Energy of Benzene and Naphthalene and the Hydrocarbon Free Radicals" (PDF). The Journal of Chemical Physics. 1 (6): 362. Bibcode:1933JChPh...1..362P. doi:10.1063/1.1749304. Archived (PDF) from the original on 2022-10-09.
- —— (1935). "The Structure and Entropy of Ice and of Other Crystals with Some Randomness of Atomic Arrangement". Journal of the American Chemical Society. 57 (12): 2680–2684. Bibcode:1935JAChS..57.2680P. doi:10.1021/ja01315a102.
- —— (1940). "A Theory of the Structure and Process of Formation of Antibodies*". Journal of the American Chemical Society. 62 (10): 2643–2657. Bibcode:1940JAChS..62.2643P. doi:10.1021/ja01867a018.
- —— (1947). "Atomic Radii and Interatomic Distances in Metals". Journal of the American Chemical Society. 69 (3): 542–553. Bibcode:1947JAChS..69..542P. doi:10.1021/ja01195a024.
- ——; Itano, H. A.; Singer, S. J.; Wells, I. C. (1949). "Sickle Cell Anemia, a Molecular Disease". Science. 110 (2865): 543–548. Bibcode:1949Sci...110..543P. doi:10.1126/science.110.2865.543. PMID 15395398. S2CID 31674765.
- ——; Corey, R. B.; Branson, H. R. (1951). "The structure of proteins: Two hydrogen-bonded helical configurations of the polypeptide chain". Proceedings of the National Academy of Sciences. 37 (4): 205–11. Bibcode:1951PNAS...37..205P. doi:10.1073/pnas.37.4.205. PMC 1063337. PMID 14816373.
- —— (1964). "The Architecture of Molecules". Proceedings of the National Academy of Sciences. 51 (5): 977–984. Bibcode:1964PNAS...51..977P. doi:10.1073/pnas.51.5.977. ISSN 0027-8424. PMC 300194. PMID 16591181.

== See also ==
- List of peace activists
- Niacin
- Nobel disease

== General and cited references ==
- Hargittai, István (2000). Hargittai, Magdolna (ed.). Candid Science: Conversations with Famous Chemists (Reprinted ed.). London: Imperial College Press. ISBN 978-1-86094-151-1.
- Marinacci, Barbara, ed. (1995). Linus Pauling: In His Own Words: Selected Writings, Speeches, and Interviews. Introduction by Linus Pauling. New York: Simon & Schuster. ISBN 978-0-684-81387-5. online
- Pauling, Linus. Selected Scientific Papers Vol. II online
- Sturchio, Jeffrey L. (1987-04-06). Linus C. Pauling, Transcript of an Interview Conducted by Jeffrey L. Sturchio in Denver, Colorado on 6 April 1987 (PDF). Philadelphia, PA: Chemical Heritage Foundation.

Awards and achievements
Preceded by Hermann Staudinger	Laureate of the Nobel Prize in Chemistry; 1954	Succeeded by Vincent du Vigneaud
Preceded by Dag Hammarskjöld	Laureate of the Nobel Peace Prize; 1962	Succeeded by International Committee of the Red Cross, League of Red Cross Societies
