= Megavitamin-B6 syndrome =

Syndrome marked by sensory neuropathy induced by excess vitamin B6

Megavitamin-B_{6} syndrome
- Other names: Vitamin B_{6} Excess, Hypervitaminosis B_{6}, Vitamin B_{6} Toxicity
- Specialty: Neurology, toxicology
- Symptoms: Peripheral sensory neuropathy
- Usual onset: Gradual onset with slow progression, in the usual case of chronic vitamin B_{6} supplementation.
- Duration: Usually, but not always, resolves within 6 months from cessation of vitamin B_{6}.
- Causes: Chronic vitamin B_{6} supplementation, or acute parenteral or oral over‐dosages of vitamin B_{6}.
- Risk factors: Impaired kidney function, parenteral nutrition
- Diagnostic method: Serum testing for elevated levels of vitamin B_{6}, testing of tendon reflexes, nerve conduction studies and electrodiagnostic testing.
- Differential diagnosis: Progressive mixed sensory or sensorimotor polyneuropathy of undetermined etiology.
- Treatment: Cessation of vitamin B_{6} supplementation.
- Prognosis: Symptom progression for 2-6 weeks following cessation of vitamin B_{6}, followed by gradual improvement.

Megavitamin-B_{6} syndrome is a collection of symptoms that can result from chronic supplementation, or acute overdose, of vitamin B_{6}. While it is also known as hypervitaminosis B_{6}, vitamin B_{6} toxicity and vitamin B_{6} excess, megavitamin-b6 syndrome is the name used in the Tenth Revision of the International Classification of Diseases, ICD-10. (Note: While megavitamin-B_{6} syndrome, hypervitaminosis B_{6}, vitamin B_{6} toxicity and vitamin B_{6} excess are officially recognized, terms for this in literate vary. Often vitamin B_{6} and its most common supplemental vitamer, pyridoxine, are used interchangeably. Some other terms include vitamin B_{6} overdose, pyridoxine abuse, pyridoxine megavitamosis, pyridoxine poisoning, and pyridoxine neuropathy.)

The syndrome is notable not only for its impact on peripheral nerve function but also because of its generally, but not always, reversible nature upon cessation of vitamin B_{6} intake. Usually, but not always, cases resolve within six months after stopping the vitamin B_{6} supplementation, although some symptoms can intensify briefly after cessation—a phenomenon known as "coasting." Diagnosis typically involves serum tests to measure elevated levels of vitamin B_{6}, along with nerve conduction studies and other neurodiagnostic evaluations.

The condition shows that a substance safe at recommended dosages can cause serious harm when taken in excess.

== Signs and symptoms ==
The predominant symptom is peripheral sensory neuropathy that is experienced as numbness, pins-and-needles and burning sensations (paresthesia) in a patient's limbs on both sides of their body. Patients may experience unsteadiness of gait, incoordination (ataxia), involuntary muscle movements (choreoathetosis) the sensation of an electric zap in their bodies (Lhermitte's sign), a heightened sensitivity to sense stimuli including photosensitivity (hyperesthesia), impaired skin sensation (hypoesthesia), numbness around the mouth, and gastrointestinal symptoms such as nausea and heartburn. The ability to sense vibrations and to sense one's position are diminished to a greater degree than pain or temperature. Skin lesions have also been reported. Megavitamin-B_{6} syndrome may also contribute to burning mouth syndrome. Potential psychiatric symptoms range from anxiety, depression, agitation, and cognitive deficits to psychosis.

Symptom severity appears to be dose-dependent (higher doses cause more severe symptoms) and the duration of supplementation with vitamin B_{6} before onset of systems appears to be inversely proportional to the amount taken daily (the smaller the daily dosage, the longer it will take for symptoms to develop). It is also possible that some individuals are more susceptible to the toxic effects of vitamin B_{6} than others. Megavitamin-B_{6} syndrome has been reported in doses as low as 24 mg/day.

Symptoms may also be dependent on the form of vitamin B_{6} taken in supplements. It has been proposed that vitamin B_{6} in supplements should be in pyridoxal or pyridoxal phosphate form rather than pyridoxine as these are thought to reduce the likelihood of toxicity. A tissue culture study, however, showed that all B_{6} vitamers that could be converted into active coenzymes (pyridoxal, pyridoxine and pyridoxamine) were neurotoxic at similar concentrations. It has been shown, in vivo, that supplementing with pyridoxal or pyridoxal phosphate increases pyridoxine concentrations in humans, meaning there are metabolic pathways from each vitamer of B_{6} to the all other forms. Consuming high amounts of vitamin B_{6} from food has not been reported to cause adverse effects.

Early diagnosis and cessation of vitamin B_{6} supplementation can reduce the morbidity of the syndrome.

== Cause ==
While vitamin B_{6} is water-soluble, it accumulates in the body. The half-life vitamin B_{6} is measured at around two to four weeks, it is stored in muscle, plasma, the liver, red blood cells and bound to proteins in tissues.

=== Potential mechanisms ===
The common supplemental form of vitamin B_{6}, pyridoxine, is similar to pyridine, which can be neurotoxic. Pyridoxine has limited transport across the blood–brain barrier, explaining why the central nervous system is spared. Cell bodies of motor fibers are located within the spinal cord, which is also restricted by the blood-brain barrier, explaining why motor impairment is rare. The dorsal root ganglia, however, are located outside of the blood-brain barrier making them more susceptible.

Pyridoxine is converted to pyridoxal phosphate via two enzymes, pyridoxal kinase and pyridoxine 5′-phosphate oxidase. High levels of pyridoxine can inhibit these enzymes. As pyridoxal phosphate is the active form of vitamin B_{6} this saturation of pyridoxine could mimic a deficiency of vitamin B_{6}.

== Tolerable upper limits ==
Several government agencies have reviewed the data on vitamin B_{6} supplementation and produced consumption upper limits with the desired goal to prevent sensory neuropathy from excessive amounts. Each agency developed its own criteria for usable studies in relation to tolerable upper limits, and as such the recommendations vary by agency. Between agencies, current tolerable upper limit guidelines vary from 10 mg per day to 100 mg per day.

Daily vitamin B_{6} tolerable upper limits for adults as established by the agency
Agency	Upper limit	Notes	Reference
National Health Service (NHS) United Kingdom	10 mg/day		
Norwegian Scientific Committee for Food and Environment (VKM)	25 mg/day	In 2017 VKM proposed to raise this to 25 mg/day, it was previously 4.2 mg/day.	
Netherlands Food and Consumer Product Safety Authority (NVWA)	25 mg/day	Supplements may only contain dosages of 21 mg/day.	
European Food Safety Authority	25 mg/day		
Ministry of Health, Labour and Welfare (厚生労働省, Kōsei-rōdō-shō) Japan	40–60 mg/day	The adult UL was set at 40–45 mg/day for women and 50–60 mg/day for men, with the lower values in those ranges for adults over 70 years of age	
National Health and Medical Research Council (NHMRC) Australia	50 mg/day		
U.S. Institute of Medicine - Food and Nutrition Board	100 mg/day		

Reviews of vitamin B_{6} related neuropathy cautioned that supplementation at doses greater than 50 mg per day for extended periods of time may be harmful and should be discouraged. In 2008, the Australian Complementary Medicines Evaluation Committee recommended warning statements appear on products containing daily doses of 50 mg or more vitamin B_{6} to avoid toxicity.

The relationship between the amount of vitamin B_{6} consumed, and the serum levels of those who consume it, varies between individuals. Some people may have high serum concentrations without symptoms of neuropathy. It is not known if inhalation of vitamin B_{6} while, for example, working with animal feed containing vitamin B_{6} is safe.

=== Exceptions ===
High parenteral doses of vitamin B_{6} are used to treat isoniazid overdose with no adverse effects found, although a preservative in parenteral vitamin B_{6} may cause transient worsening of metabolic acidosis. High doses of vitamin B_{6} are used to treat gyromitra mushroom (false morel) poisoning, hydrazine exposure and homocystinuria Doses of 50 mg to 100 mg per day may also be used to treat pyridoxine deficient seizures and when patients are taking other medications that reduce vitamin B_{6}. Daily doses of 10 mg to 50 mg are recommended for patients undergoing hemodialysis.

Outside of rare medical conditions, placebo-controlled studies have generally failed to show benefits of high doses of vitamin B_{6}. Reviews of supplementing with vitamin B_{6} have not found it to be effective at reducing swelling, reducing stress, producing energy, preventing neurotoxicity, or treating asthma.

== Diagnosis ==
The clinical hallmark of megavitamin-B_{6} syndrome is ataxia due to sensory polyneuropathy. Blood tests are performed to rule out other causes and to confirm an elevated level of vitamin B_{6} with an absence of hypophosphatasia. Examination does not typically show signs of a motor deficit, dysfunction of the autonomic nervous system or impairment of the central nervous system, although in severe cases motor and autonomic imparement can occur. When examined, patients typically have diminished reflexes (hyporeflexia), such as a diminished response when performing an ankle jerk reflex test. Nerve conduction studies typically show normal motor conduction but a decrease in large sensory wave amplitude in the arms and legs. Needle electromyography studies generally reveal no signs of denervation.

=== Classification ===
Megavitamin-B_{6} syndrome is characterized mainly by degeneration of dorsal root ganglion axons and cell bodies, although it also affects the trigeminal ganglia. It is classified as a sensory ganglionopathy due to involvement of these ganglia. (Note: The terms sensory ganglionopathy and sensory neuronopathy are interchangeable.) In electrodiagnostic testing, it has characteristic non-length-dependent abnormalities of sensory action potentials that occur globally, rather than distally decreasing of sensory nerve action potential amplitudes. Megavitamin-B_{6} syndrome is predominately a large fiber neuropathy characterized by sensory loss of joint position, vibration and ataxia. Although it has characteristics of small fiber neuropathy in severe cases where there is impairment of pain, temperature, and autonomic functions.

== Treatment ==
The primary treatment for megavitamin-B_{6} syndrome is to stop taking supplemental vitamin B_{6}. Physical therapy, including vestibular rehabilitation, has been used in attempts to improve recovery following cessation of vitamin B_{6} supplementation. Medications such as amitriptyline have been used to help with neuropathic pain.

In experimental tests using animal subjects, neurotrophic factors, specifically neurotrophin-3, were shown to potentially reverse the neuropathy caused from the vitamin B_{6} toxicity. With rats and mice, improvement has also been seen with 4-methylcatechol, a specific chicory extract, coffee and trigonelline.

== Prognosis ==
Other than with extremely high doses of vitamin B_{6}, neurologic dysfunction improves following cessation of vitamin B_{6} supplementation and usually, but not always, resolves within six months. In cases of acute high doses, for example in people receiving daily doses of 2 grams of vitamin B_{6} per kilogram of body weight, symptoms may be irreversible and may additionally cause pseudoathetosis.

In the immediate 2–6 weeks following discontinuation of vitamin B_{6}, patients may experience a symptom progression before gradual improvement begins. This is known as coasting and is encountered in other toxic neuropathies. A vitamin B_{6} substance dependency may exist in daily dosages of 200 mg or more, making a drug withdrawal effect possible when discontinued.

== See also ==
- B vitamins
- Dietary Reference Intake
- Dietary supplement
- Hypervitaminosis
- Hypervitaminosis A
- Hypervitaminosis D
- Megavitamin therapy
- Overnutrition
- Peripheral nervous system
- Regulation of alternative medicine
