= OneStep =

Israeli health-technology company

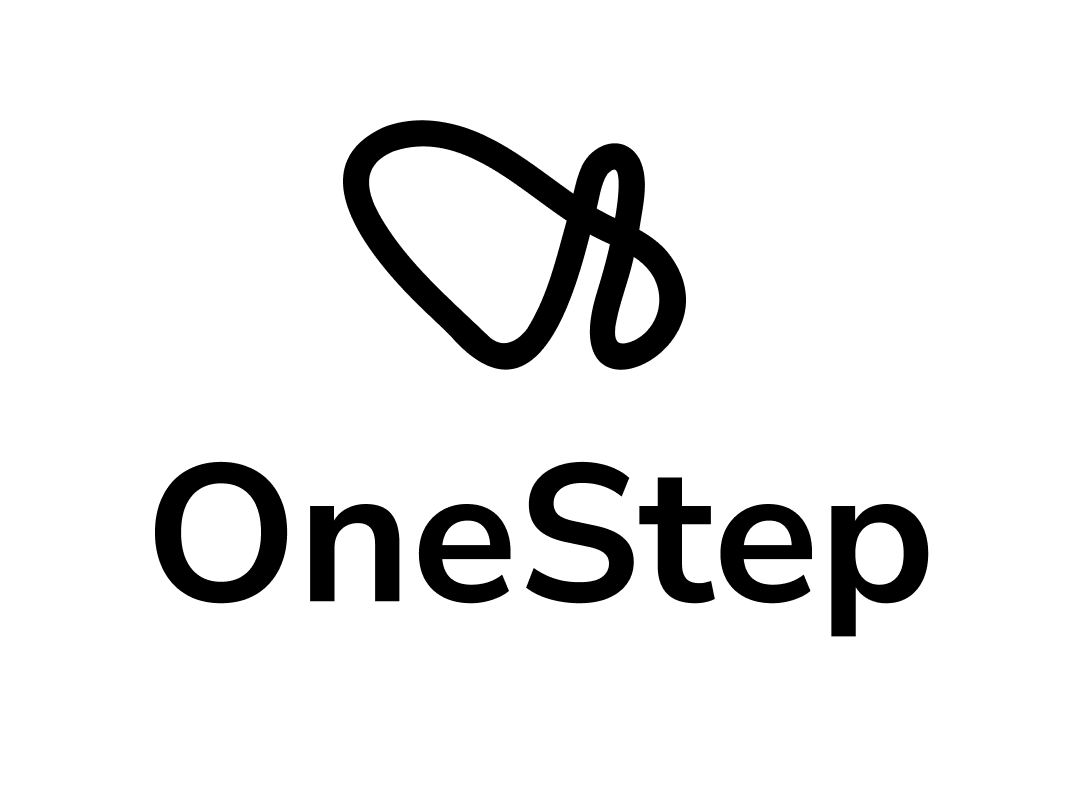
- Company type: Private
- Industry: Health care; Medical software; Digital health
- Founded: 2019
- Founders: Tomer Shussman; Yuval Naveh; Shahar Davidson; Amir Milo
- Headquarters: Tel Aviv, Israel
- Area served: United States; Israel (primary markets)
- Key people: Tomer Shussman (CEO); Yuval Naveh (CSO); Shahar Davidson (CTO); Amir Milo (Executive Chairman)
- Products: Smartphone-based gait and motion analysis; clinician portal; patient app; RTM (remote therapeutic monitoring) workflows
- Number of employees: ~51–200 (2025 est.)
- Website: https://www.onestep.co

OneStep (stylized ONESTEP) is an Israeli health-technology company that develops smartphone-based motion analysis and digital care software for healthcare providers. Its platform transforms a patient’s smartphone into a clinical-grade motion lab for gait and mobility assessment, fall-risk detection, remote therapeutic monitoring, and outcomes tracking across hospitals, clinics, senior living communities, and orthotics/prosthetics services.

== History ==
OneStep was founded by Tomer Shussman, Yuval Naveh, Shahar Davidson and Amir Milo in Tel Aviv in late 2019. In February 2020, the company completed early seed financing and began initial market activity. In January 2022, OneStep closed a Series A round of $9 million, and in October 2024, it announced a $36 million Series B led by Team8 and Vintage, bringing the company’s disclosed total funding to about $48 million.

On 8 February 2022, OneStep started a partnership with Kinomatic for pre/post-op physical-therapy programs. In August, the company launched fall-risk detection capability that uses smartphone-collected gait trends to alert clinicians of increased fall risk, and in November, launched upper-body range-of-motion capabilities.

In April 2023, OneStep partnered with FOX Rehabilitation in senior-care deployments and joint programs, which in October 2024, was named a Silver Innovator of the Year by McKnight’s Tech Awards. In June, the company announced a research collaboration with the Icahn School of Medicine at Mount Sinai. In December, OneStep was selected in PM360’s 2023 Innovations list (Telehealth/Telemedicine category).

In April 2024, OneStep, together with together with Mount Sinai, started a research collaboration on remote physical-therapy validation. In February 2025, OneStep integrated with Yardi to extend mobility and fall-risk monitoring into senior-living management workflows.

In December 2025, OneStep partnered with Zimmer Biomet .

== Activities and products ==
OneStep’s main product is a smartphone app and clinician portal that extract spatiotemporal gait and motion parameters from a phone carried on the person, requiring no extra wearable sensors. The technology is used for remote therapeutic monitoring (RTM), post-operative rehabilitation, fall-risk management, orthotics/prosthetics fitting and population-level monitoring in senior-living and health-system settings.

Validation studies and peer-reviewed research have examined OneStep’s smartphone-based gait analysis in relation to standard functional measures such as the Timed Up and Go (TUG) and Six-Minute Walk Test (6MWT).

== Reviews ==
A peer‑reviewed study published in the Journal of Orthopaedic Surgery and Research in 2022 found that the OneStep smartphone app provides “moderate‑to‑excellent” reliability compared with a motion‑capture laboratory and concluded it is a feasible alternative for gait assessment.

In 2024, health-tech news outlets reported that the platform was in use by over 20 providers across multiple care settings and had been integrated with EHR systems such as PointClickCare.

== Regulatory status ==
OneStep’s device, manufactured by Celloscope Ltd. (Tel Aviv – Jaffa, Israel), is listed in the U.S. Food and Drug Administration’s (FDA) Establishment Registration & Device Listing database under product code ISD (“Exerciser, measuring”), which denotes a Class I, 510(k)-exempt device. Celloscope Ltd.’s FDA facility registration (Owner/Operator Number 10084556; Registration Number 3021907566) and its device listing are publicly available.

== Further readings ==
- OneStep holds a granted U.S. patent: U.S. Patent No. 11,751,813 – System, Method and Computer Program Product for Detecting a Mobile Phone User’s Risky Medical Condition (granted 2023).
- The company has also filed additional U.S. patent applications, including:
  - Assessment of a person's gait (calibration-free) (US Application No. US20200289027 A1)
  - Systems and methods for electronically monitoring user health by analyzing gait (US Application No. US20210393166 A1)
  - Gait measurement with triaxial accelerometer/gyro to monitor rehabilitation progress (US Application No. US20150230734 A1)
