= Parallel Walk Test =

- Test of: assess balance during walking

The Parallel Walk Test is a quick and simple quantitative measuring tool for balance during walking and could be a useful tool in clinical settings for assessing balance before and after treatments and to discriminate high fall risk potential.

== Description ==
The test takes 3–5 minutes and consists of walking 6 meters between 2 parallel lines measured 8”, 12” and 15” across in width. The test is scored based on number of stepping errors, i.e. stepping on a line (+1) or stepping over a line (+2), where a higher score denotes decrease performance and total time to perform walk. A warm-up walk of 20m can be performed as well as 1 practice walk.

== Lateral movement ==
It was created to address the significance lateral movement, during walking, has to balance and fall risk and is based on research that indicated increased lateral movement during walking corresponds to decrease dynamic stability. Saunders, et.al., proposed in 1953 an inverted pendulum model to describe normal and pathological walking. They described six "determinants" of walking that control the body's center of gravity, they reasoned that normal walking controls the center of gravity while pathological walking will demonstrate excessive movement of the center of gravity. One of the "determinants" is the lateral movement of the pelvis and excessive movement at the pelvis can be corrected by the position of the foot and leg. Using the inverted pendulum model, MacKinnon and Winter found, to make sure balance was preserved, the center of mass should pass medial to the supporting foot. Current research has shown that testing balance function under narrow stance conditions provides adequate difficulty to help reveal insufficiency in balance control that could increase the risk of falls and that differences between fallers and non-fallers were most pronounced for measures related to lateral stability. Instability during walking is primarily in the mediolateral direction and decrease in mediolateral stability has been shown to be a major risk factor for falls in older adults. Further research has found that fallers tend to have wider step width and slower walking speeds.

== Older adults ==
Falls in older adults occur most commonly during walking so appropriate balance testing should contain walking to test for stability during walking. Current measuring tools, like the Berg Balance Scale and the Timed Up and Go, may lack key components to measure balance during walking adequately. The Berg Balance Scale is considered the “gold standard” of balance testing but does not have a walking component. The Timed Up and Go is frequently used as well to measure balance and has a walking component but has only a temporal component and has no objective description of balance during the activity. The Parallel Walk Test provides quantitative data that describes the level of dynamic balance as well as gives temporal data during walking.

== Research ==
Research showed that the inter-rater reliability ICC range=0.93-0.99 and the test-retest reliability ICC range=0.63-0.90. To determine validity, Lark and Sowjanya used tandem stance (one foot directly in front of the other), parallel stance (feet 20 cm apart) and tandem walking for 6 meters. The Validity Co-efficient (percent correctly classified as faller)=0.70-0.84 for the balance score. There was a significant correlation between tandem stance mean time and scores of the Parallel Walk Test r=0.49 p<.001. The study showed non-fallers were able to stand 3 times longer compared to fallers and tandem standing is incorporated to several balance measurement tools, i.e. Berg Balance Scale. The reliability of the Parallel Walk Test was also tested with people with strokes by Ng et.al. They found intra-rater reliability ICC range=0.784-0.962, inter-rater and test-retest reliabilities ICC range=0.864-1.00. The sensitivity=84%-89% and specificity=71%-80%. They also found significant correlation between the PWT, all 3 widths, and Berg Balance Scale r=-0.617--0.682, p<.05 and TUG r=0.466-0.658, p<0.05.

== Variations ==
Variations of the Parallel Walk Test, referred to as Narrow Path Walking Test, have been used for identification of elderly fallers, and assessing balance in people with MS. Gimmons et.al used 50% of the distance between the subject’s ASIS (anterior superior iliac spine) plus the width of the subject’s shoe to normalize the challenge to different body morphologies. They used 3 trials and averaged the time and score. They also had the subjects perform the Tinetti Performance Oriented Mobility Assessment, POMA and fill out a questionnaire regarding fear of falling, FES-1. They found a significant difference in time between fallers and non-fallers F=11.498, P<0.001, when age, gender, and fear of falling were adjusted. Overall, they found Narrow Path Walking Test was better able to identify fallers than the POMA and FES-1.

Rosenblum and Melzer used 50% ASIS distance plus shoe width in their study with people with Multiple Sclerosis. They found for concurrent validity, a number of step errors correlated with Four Square Step Test, r=.75, p<.001 and with 2 minute Walk Test r=-0.51, p<0.01. For test-retest reliability, they found number of stepping error ICC=0.94 (0.87-0.97) and time ICC=0.64 (0.27-0.82). They found that the number of step errors and trial velocity was the most reliable parameters tested that detect instability during walking for people with Multiple Sclerosis.

== Studies ==
Many studies have shown that the Parallel Walk Test, and its variation the Narrow Path Walk Test, is a valid and reliable measurement tools to assess balance while walking for a variety of conditions.
