= Charité =

University hospital in Berlin

Charité – Berlin University Medicine
- Charité – Universitätsmedizin Berlin
- Motto: Forschen, Lehren, Heilen, Helfen
- Motto in English: Researching, teaching, healing, helping
- Type: Public
- Established: 1710; 316 years ago
- Affiliations: Free University of Berlin, Humboldt University of Berlin
- Academic affiliations: German Universities Excellence Initiative
- Budget: €2.3 billion
- Chairman: Heyo K. Kroemer
- Academic staff: 5,242 (307 professors)
- Total staff: 18,217
- Students: 9,485
- Location: Berlin, Germany
- Campus: Urban
- Website: www.charite.de

The Charité – Universitätsmedizin Berlin (Charité – University Medicine Berlin; French: [ʃaʁite]) is a public medical school and hospital in Berlin, Germany. It is the largest university hospital in Europe. The medical school is affiliated with Humboldt University of Berlin and Free University of Berlin.

The Charité traces its origins to 1710. The complex is spread over four campuses and comprises around 3,000 beds, 15,500 staff, 8,000 students, and more than 60 operating theaters, and has a turnover of two billion euros annually. It is one of the ten best hospitals in the world.

The modern history of medicine has been significantly influenced by scientists who worked at the Charité. Rudolf Virchow was the founder of cellular pathology, while Robert Koch developed vaccines for anthrax, cholera, and tuberculosis. For his life's work Koch is seen as one of the founders of modern medicine. More than half of all German Nobel Prize winners in Physiology or Medicine, including Emil von Behring, Robert Koch, and Paul Ehrlich, have worked at the Charité.

In 2010–2011 the medical schools of Humboldt University and Freie Universität Berlin were united under the roof of the Charité. The admission rate of the reorganized medical school was 3.9% for the 2019–2020 academic year.

== History ==
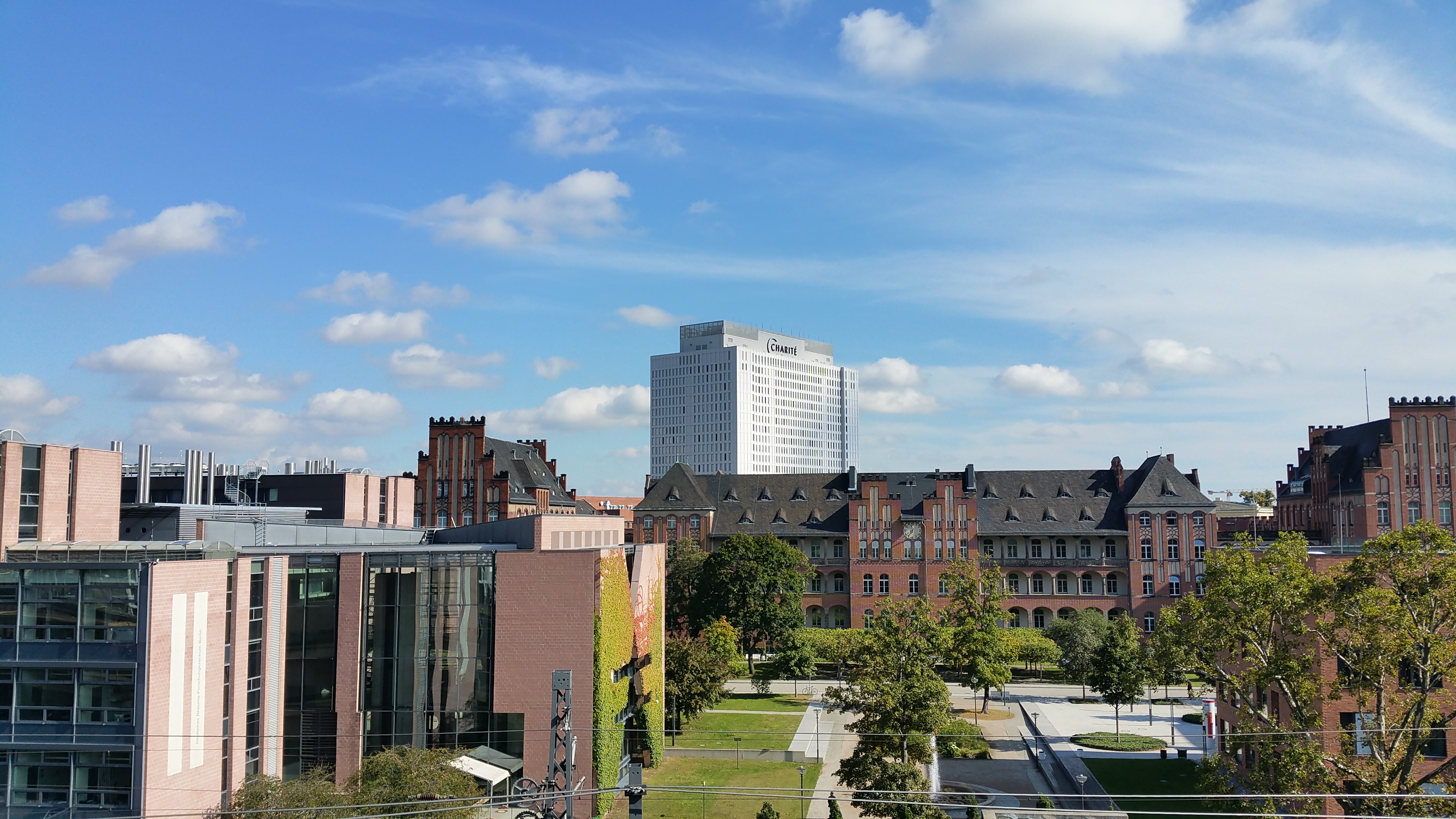
Historic and modern buildings at Campus Charité Mitte (CCM)

Locations of the four campuses of Charité in Berlin

Complying with an order of King Frederick I of Prussia from 14 November 1709, the hospital was established north of the Berlin city walls in 1710 in anticipation of an outbreak of the bubonic plague that had already depopulated East Prussia. After the plague spared the city, it came to be used as a charity hospital for the poor; so on 9 January 1727, King Frederick William I of Prussia gave it the French name "Charité".

The construction of an anatomical theatre in 1713 marks the beginning of the medical school, then supervised by the collegium medico-chirurgicum of the Prussian Academy of Sciences.

In the 19th century, after the University of Berlin (today Humboldt University) was founded in 1810, the dean of the medical college Christoph Wilhelm Hufeland integrated the Charité as a teaching hospital in 1828. During this time it became home to such notable medical pioneers as Rudolf Virchow, known as "the father of modern pathology" and whose name is given to the eponymous "Virchow's Method" of autopsy; the Swiss psychiatrist and neurologist Otto Binswanger, whose work in vascular dementia led to the discovery of Binswanger's Disease—so coined by his colleague Alois Alzheimer; Robert Koch, who identified the specific causative agents of tuberculosis, cholera, and anthrax; and Emil von Behring, widely known as a "saviour of children" for his 1894 discovery of a diphtheria antitoxin at a time when diphtheria was a major cause of child death (among many others).

During the Second World War, the Charité endured the Battle of Berlin and Berlin was taken by the Red Army on 2 May 1945. Though the majority of its original and pre-war structure was damaged or destroyed during the war, it was nevertheless used as a Red Army hospital. The Charité remained in the Soviet Sector of Berlin until the formation of the German Democratic Republic, the GDR (German: Deutsche Demokratische Republik, DDR) in 1949, more commonly called East Germany. Under the Communists, standards were largely maintained, and it became a showpiece for Eastern Bloc propaganda during the Cold War. Corpses of Berlin Wall victims were taken here for autopsies.

In 1990, with the reunification of Germany, and in the years following, Charité once again became one of the world's leading research and teaching hospitals.

== Organization ==
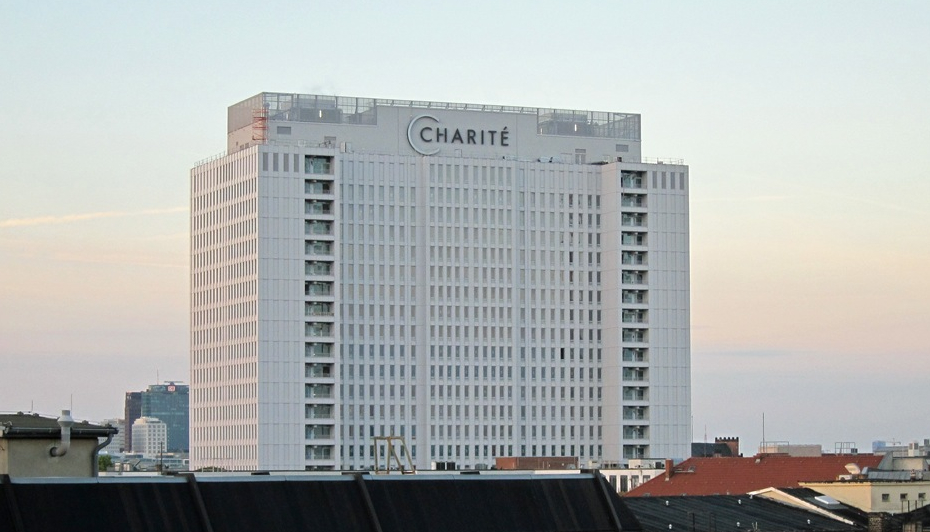
Campus Charité Mitte (CCM) main building

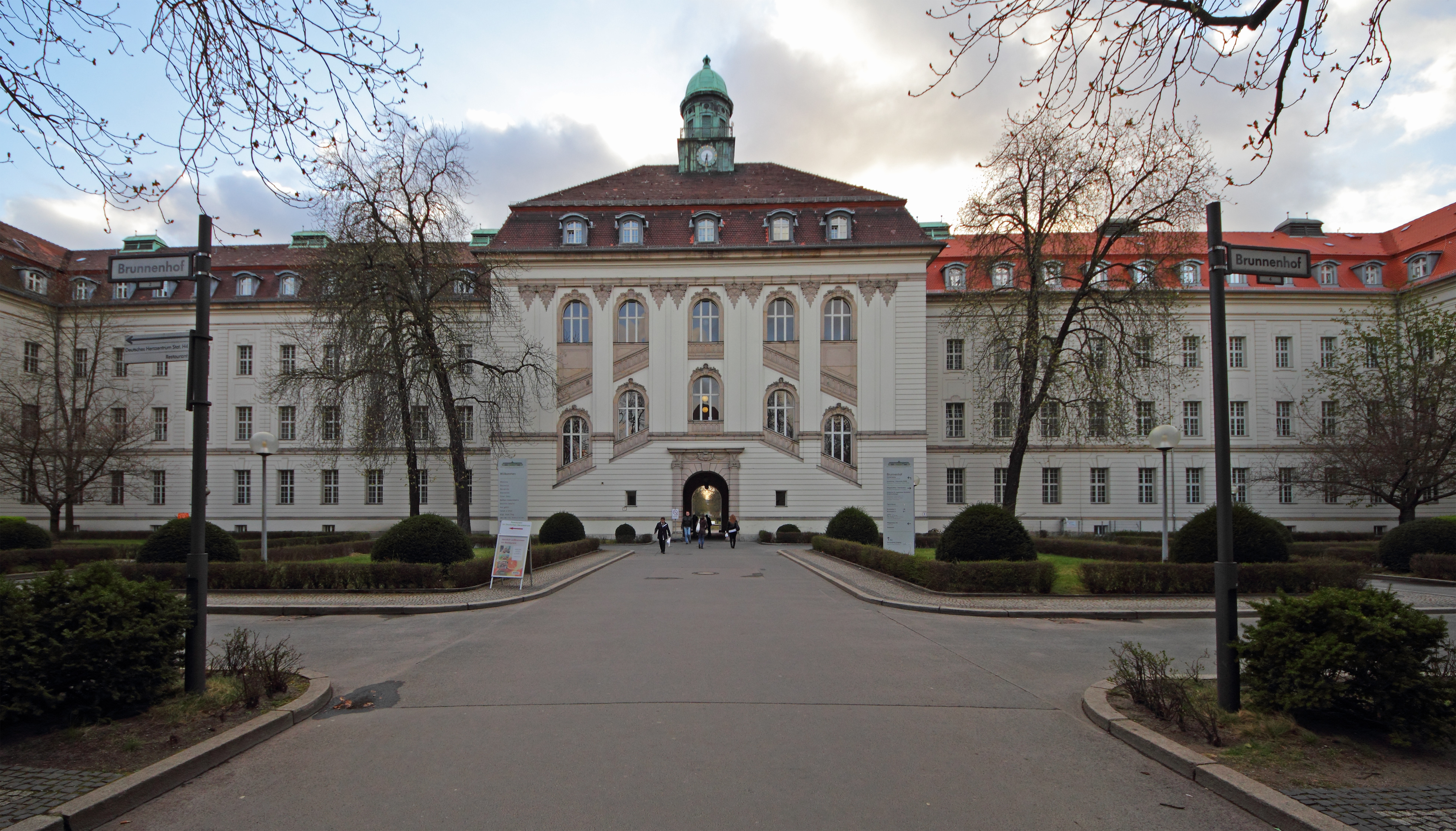
Campus Virchow Klinikum (CVK), German Heart Center Berlin (Deutsches Herzzentrum Berlin)

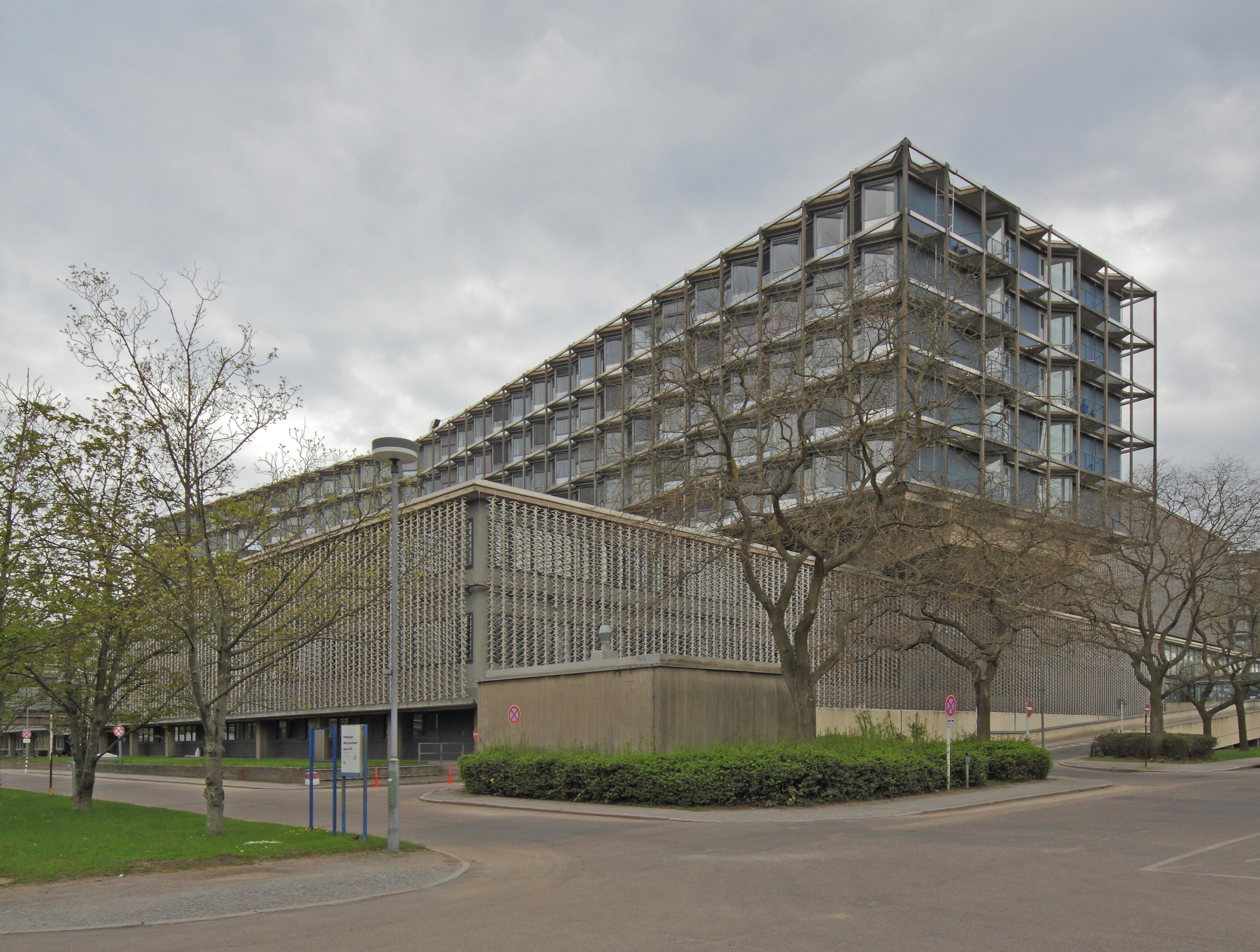
Campus Benjamin Franklin (CBF)

The Charité has four different campuses across the city of Berlin with a total of 3,001 beds:

- Campus in Mitte, Berlin 52.525397°N 13.378467°E
- Campus Benjamin Franklin (CBF) in Lichterfelde, Berlin 52.441830°N 13.320389°E
- Campus Virchow Klinikum (CVK) in Wedding, Berlin 52.542345°N 13.343057°E
- Campus Berlin-Buch (CBB) in Buch, Berlin 52.624654°N 13.499564°E

In 2001, the Helios Clinics Group acquired the hospitals in Buch with their 1,200 beds. Still, the Charité continues to use the campus for teaching and research and has more than 200 staff members located there. The Charité encompasses more than 100 clinics and scientific institutes, organized in 17 different departments, referred to as Charité Centers (CC):

- CC 1: Health and Human Sciences
- CC 2: Basic Sciences (First Year)
- CC 3: Dental, Oral and Maxillary Medicine
- CC 4: Biomedicine
- CC 5: Diagnostic Laboratory and Preventative Medicine
- CC 6: Diagnostic and Interventional Radiology and Nuclear Medicine
- CC 7: Anesthesiology, Operating-Room Management and Intensive Care Medicine
- CC 8: Surgery
- CC 9: Traumatology and Reconstructive Medicine
- CC 10: Charité Comprehensive Cancer Center
- CC 11: Global Health
- CC 12: Internal Medicine and Dermatology
- CC 13: Internal Medicine, Gastroenterology and Nephrology
- CC 14: Tumor Medicine
- CC 15: Neurology, Neurosurgery, Psychiatry
- CC 16: Audiology/Phoniatrics, Ophthalmology and Otolaryngology
- CC 17: Gynecology, Perinatal, Pediatric and Adolescent Medicine with Perinatal Center & Human Genetics

Overall, 12 of those centers focus on patient care, while the rest focuses on research and teaching. On 1 January 2023, Charité – Universitätsmedizin Berlin and the Deutsches Herzzentrum Berlin – Stiftung des bürgerlichen Rechts (DHZB) have merged their cardiac medical facilities to form the Deutsches Herzzentrum der Charité (DHZC). The DHZC is located at the three clinical campuses of Charité at Campus Virchow-Klinikum, Campus Charité Mitte and Campus Benjamin Franklin. It comprises a total of eight clinics and institutes with around 2,500 employees and has around 470 beds. It is one of the largest cardiac centres in Germany for the treatment of all cardiovascular diseases in patients of all ages

The Medical History Museum Berlin has a history dating back to 1899. The museum in its current form opened in 1998 and is famous for its pathological and anatomical collection.

== Medical school ==
University rankings

Global – Overall
- THE World: 73 (2023)

Global – Life sciences and medicine
- THE Clinical and Health: 26 (2023)

In 2003 the Berlin city and state House of Representatives passed an interim law unifying the medical faculties of both Humboldt University and Freie Universität Berlin under the roof of the Charité. Since 2010–2011 all new medical students have been enrolled in the New Revised Medical Curriculum Programme with a length of 6 years. The Charité is together with Heidelberg University Medical School Germany's most competitive medical school (2020). 3.17% of all Charité Medical School students are supported by the German Academic Scholarship Foundation, one of the highest percentages of all public German universities. The Erasmus Exchange Programme offered to Charité Medical School students includes 72 universities and is the largest in Europe. Charité students can spend up to a year at a foreign medical school with exchange partners such as the Karolinska Institute, University of Copenhagen, Sorbonne University, Jagiellonian University, Sapienza University of Rome, University of Amsterdam, and the University of Zürich. Students are also encouraged to participate in research projects, complete a dissertation, or join Charité affiliated social projects.

In 2021, the Berlin Institute of Health (BIH) became the translational research unit of Charité, making the Charité the first university clinic that receives direct and annual financial support by the federal state of Germany. Together with private charity donors like the Johanna Quandt's private excellence initiative or the Bill & Melinda Gates Foundation, as well as financing by the State of Berlin, the new direct federal investments will become the third financial foundation for research at the Charité. In addition, it is part of the Berlin University Alliance, receiving funding from the German Universities Excellence Initiative in 2019.

== Notable people ==
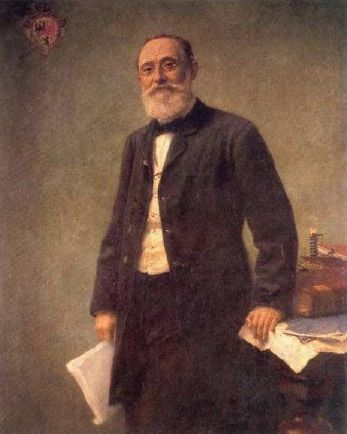
Rudolf Virchow, by Hugo Vogel

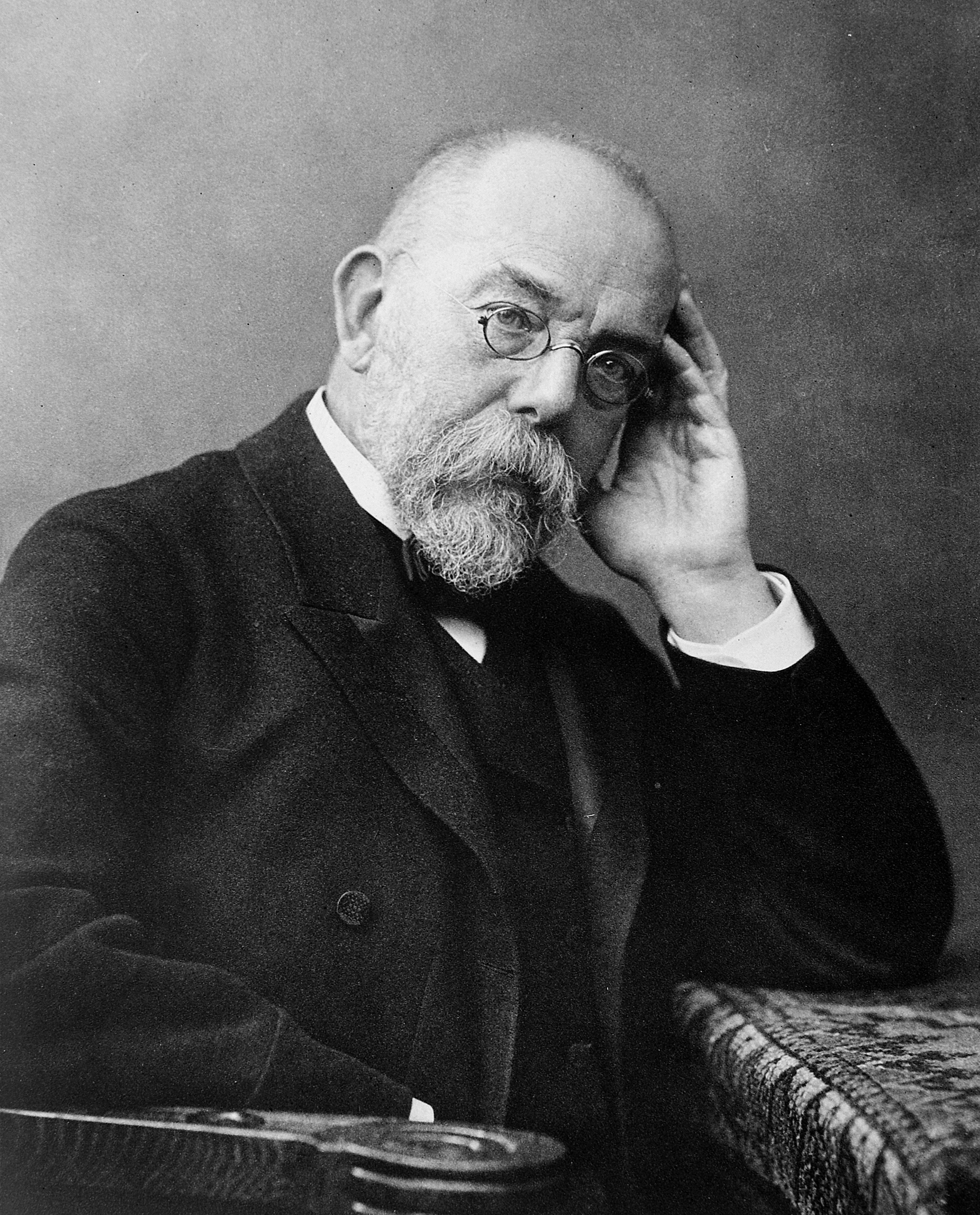
Robert Koch and the beginnings of microbiology

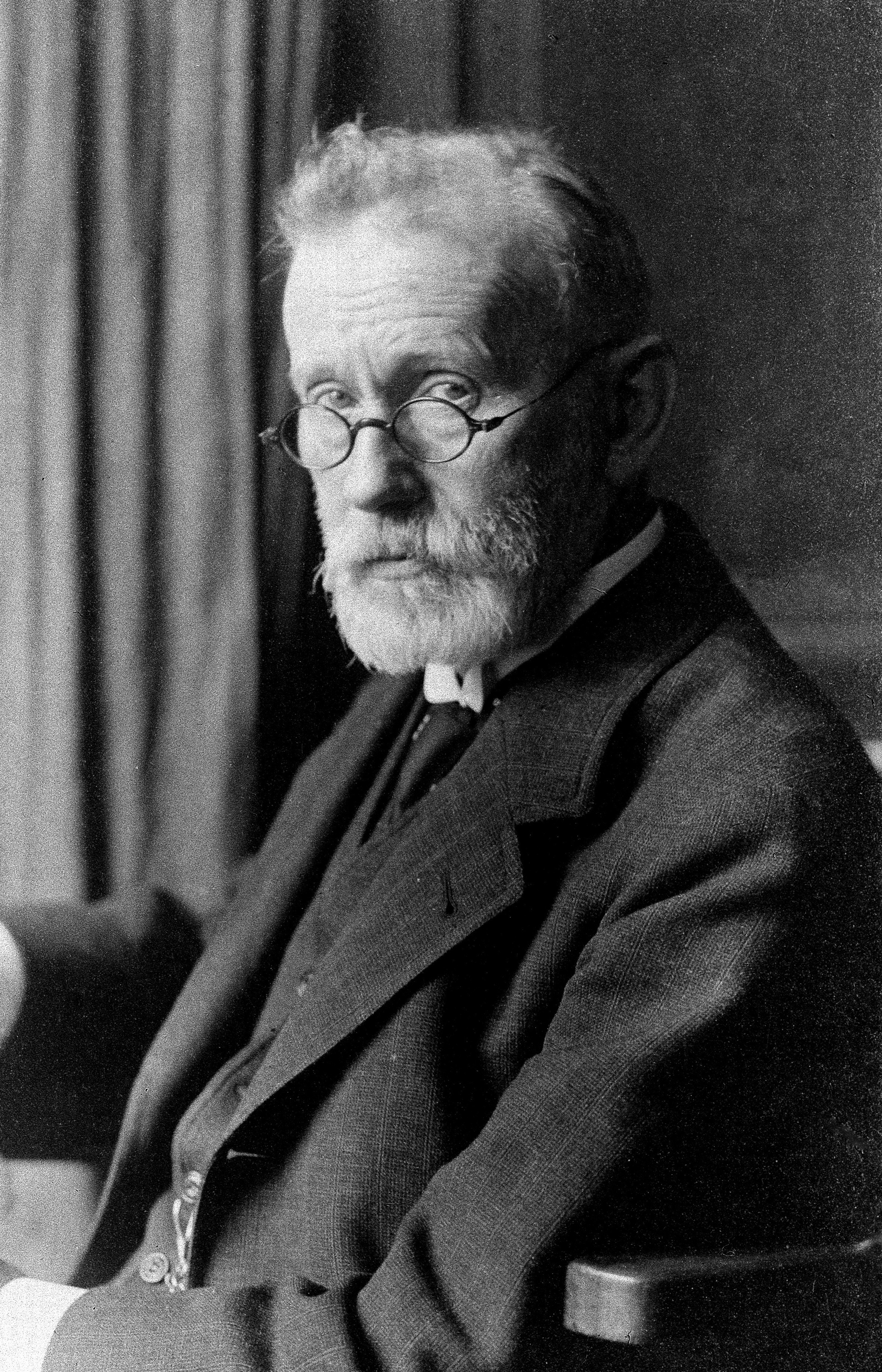
Paul Ehrlich and the introduction of antimicrobial chemotherapy at Charité

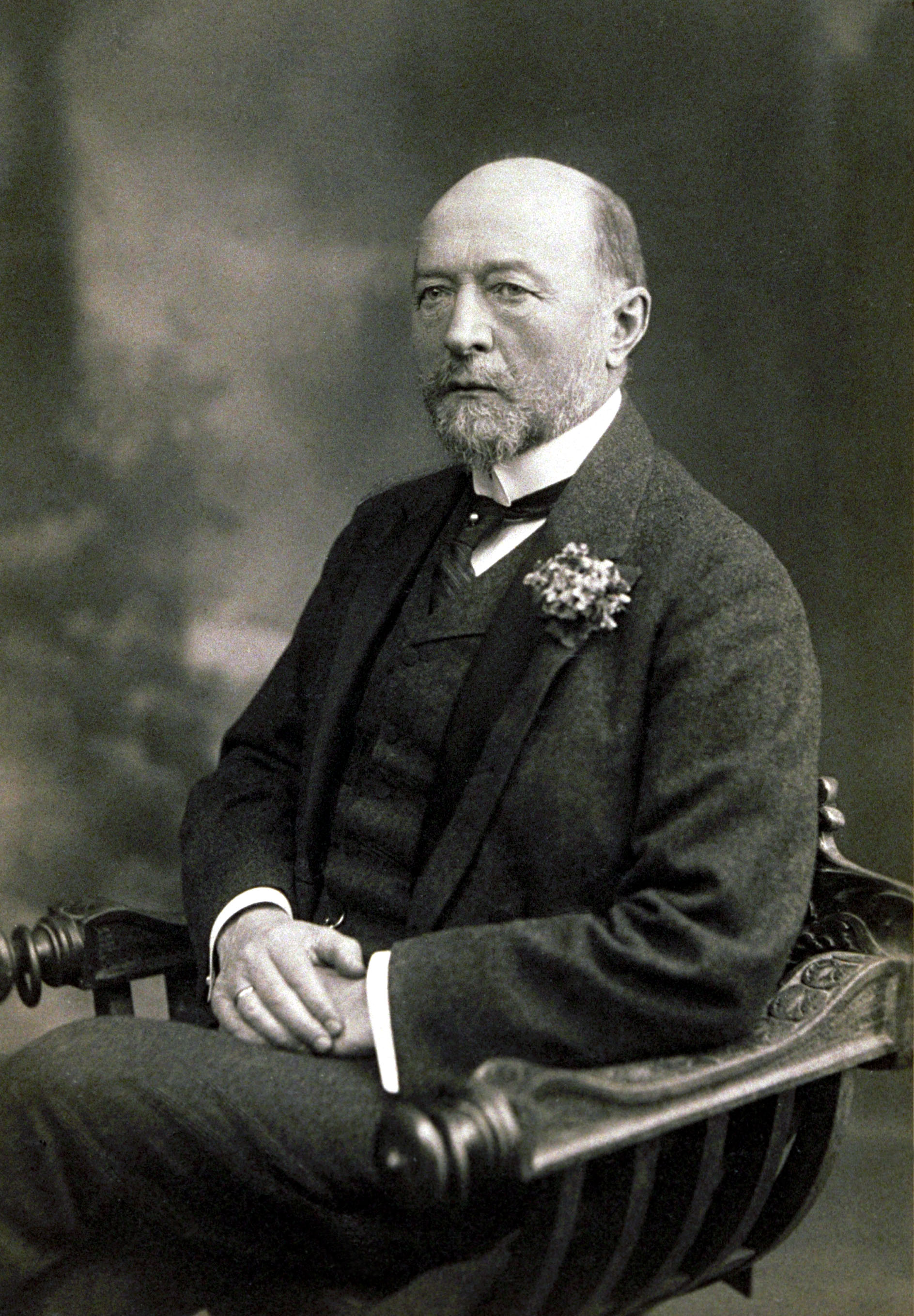
Emil von Behring

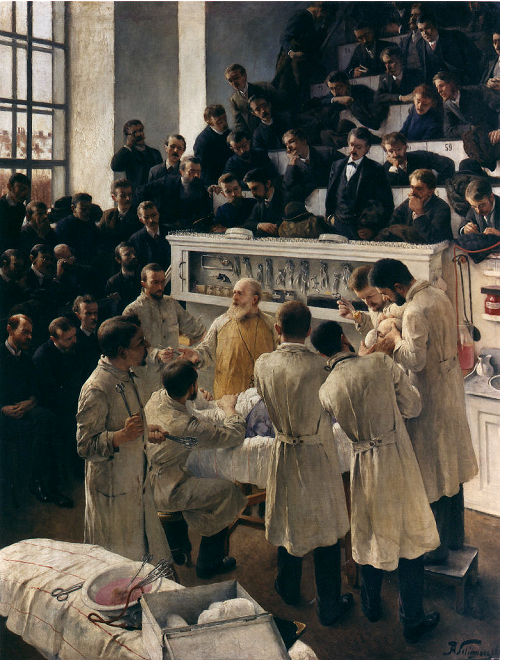
Theodor Billroth operating

Many famous physicians and scientists worked or studied at the Charité. Indeed, more than half of the German Nobel Prize winners in medicine and physiology come from the Charité. Fifty-seven Nobel laureates are affiliated with Humboldt University of Berlin and five with Freie Universität Berlin.

- Selmar Aschheim (1878–1965) – gynecologist
- Heinrich Adolf von Bardeleben (1819–1895) – surgeon
- Georg Axhausen (1877–1960) – surgeon
- Ernst von Bergmann (1836–1907) – surgeon
- August Bier (1861–1949) – surgeon
- Max Bielschowsky (1869–1940) – neuropathologist
- Theodor Billroth (1829–1894) – surgeon
- Otto Binswanger (1852–1929) – psychiatrist and neurologist
- Karl Bonhoeffer (1868 –1948) – neurologist
- Hans Gerhard Creutzfeldt (1885–1964) – neurologist and neuropathologist
- Johann Friedrich Dieffenbach (1792–1847) – surgeon
- Christian Drosten – virologist
- Friedrich Theodor von Frerichs – pathologist
- Robert Froriep – anatomist
- Wilhelm Griesinger – psychiatrist and neurologist
- Hermann von Helmholtz – physician and physicist
- Joachim Friedrich Henckel – surgeon
- Friedrich Gustav Jakob Henle – physician, pathologist and anatomist
- Eduard Heinrich Henoch – pediatrician
- Otto Heubner – pediatrician
- Rahel Hirsch – first female medical professor in Prussia
- Erich Hoffmann – dermatologist
- Anton Ludwig Ernst Horn – psychiatrist
- Gero Hütter – hematologist
- Friedrich Jolly – neurologist and psychiatrist
- Friedrich Kraus – internist
- Bernhard von Langenbeck – surgeon
- Karl Leonhard – psychiatrist
- Hugo Karl Liepmann – neurologist and psychiatrist
- Leonor Michaelis – biochemist and physician
- Hermann Oppenheim – neurologist
- Samuel Mitja Rapoport – biochemist and physician
- Moritz Heinrich Romberg – neurologist
- Ferdinand Sauerbruch – surgeon
- Curt Schimmelbusch – physician and pathologist
- Johann Lukas Schönlein – physician and pathologist
- Theodor Schwann – zoologist
- Ludwig Traube – physician and pathologist
- Rudolf Virchow – physician, founder of cell theory and modern pathology
- Karl Friedrich Otto Westphal – neurologist and psychiatrist
- Carl Wernicke – neurologist
- August von Wassermann – bacteriologist
- Caspar Friedrich Wolff – physiologist
- Bernhard Zondek – endocrinologist

=== Nobel laureates ===
- Emil Adolf von Behring – physiologist (Nobel Prize in Physiology or Medicine in 1901)
- Ernst Boris Chain – biochemist (Nobel Prize in Physiology or Medicine in 1945)
- Paul Ehrlich – immunologist (Nobel Prize in Physiology or Medicine in 1908)
- Hermann Emil Fischer – chemist (Nobel Prize in Chemistry in 1902)
- Werner Forssmann – physician (Nobel Prize in Physiology or Medicine in 1956)
- Robert Koch – physician (Nobel Prize in Physiology or Medicine in 1905)
- Albrecht Kossel (1853–1927) – physician (Nobel Prize in Physiology or Medicine in 1910)
- Sir Hans Adolf Krebs (1900–1981) – physician and biochemist (Nobel Prize in Physiology or Medicine in 1953)
- Fritz Albert Lipmann (1899–1986) – biochemist (Nobel Prize in Physiology or Medicine in 1953)
- Hans Spemann (1869–1941) – embryologist (Nobel Prize in Physiology or Medicine in 1935)
- Otto Heinrich Warburg (1883–1970) – physiologist (Nobel Prize in Physiology or Medicine in 1931)

== International partner universities ==
- UK: Oxford University
- UK: London School of Hygiene and Tropical Medicine
- UK: King's College London
- US: Northwestern University, Chicago
- Canada: Université de Montréal
- Australia: Monash University, Melbourne
- Japan: Chiba University
- Japan: Saitama Medical School
- Brazil: Universidade de São Paulo
- China: Tongji University, Shanghai
- China: Tongji Medical College, Wuhan
- Georgia: Tbilissi State Medical University
- Mexico: Universidad Nacional Autónoma de México
- Turkey: Istanbul University
- Israel: Hadassah Medical Center, Jerusalem
- Israel: Weizmann Institute, Rehovot
- Israel: Tel Aviv Sourasky Institute
- Kenya: University of Nairobi School of Medicine
- Argentina: Universidad de Buenos Aires
- Vietnam: Charite Viet Nam Company Limited

== Einstein Foundation ==
The Charité is one of the main partners of the Einstein Foundation, which was established by the city and state of Berlin in 2009. It is a "foundation that aims to promote science and research of top international caliber in Berlin and to establish the city as a centre of scientific excellence". Research fellows include:

- Thomas Südhof – biochemist (Nobel Prize in Physiology or Medicine in 2013)
- Brian Kobilka – chemist (Nobel Prize in Chemistry in 2012)
- Edvard Moser – neuroscientist (Nobel Prize in Physiology or Medicine in 2014)

== Television ==
- Charité (Season 1, takes place in 1888)
- Charité at War (Season 2, takes place between 1943 and 1945)
- Charité "In the shadow of the wall" (Season 3, takes place in 1961)

== See also ==
- List of university hospitals in Germany
