= Axhausen =

Axhausen is a surname, likely of German origin. Notable people with the surname include:

- Georg Axhausen (1877–1960), German oral and maxillofacial surgeon
- Kay Axhausen (born 1958), Swiss professor
