= Locomotive syndrome =

Medical condition

Locomotive syndrome is a medical condition of decreased mobility due to disorders of the locomotor system. The locomotor system comprises bones, joints, muscles and nerves. It is a concept put forward by three professional medical societies in Japan: the Japanese Society for Musculoskeletal Medicine, the Japanese Orthopaedic Association, and the Japanese Clinical Orthopaedic Association. Locomotive syndrome is generally found in the ageing population as locomotor functions deteriorate with age. Symptoms of locomotive syndrome include limitations in joint mobility, pain, balance disorder, malalignment and gait abnormality. Locomotive syndrome is commonly caused by chronic locomotive organ diseases. Diagnosis and assessment of locomotive syndrome is done using several tests such as the stand-up and two-step tests. The risk of having locomotive syndrome can be decreased via adequate nutrition, attainment of an exercise habit and being active.

== History ==
In 2000, the Government of Japan established the insurance system Long-term Care Insurance to resolve the issue of the drastic increase of Japanese elderly people in need of nursing care, which imposed a heavy financial burden on the Japanese society. Locomotive system disorders took up approximately a quarter of the need for long-term nursing care in Japan.

Subsequently, three professional Japanese medical societies, the Japanese Society for Musculoskeletal Medicine, the Japanese Orthopaedic Association, and the Japanese Clinical Orthopaedic Association, put forward the idea of locomotive syndrome in 2007 with the aim of enhancing public awareness of locomotive syndrome and calling for plans for its management.

== Epidemiology ==
Globally, locomotive syndrome prevalence is estimated to be approximately 10%.

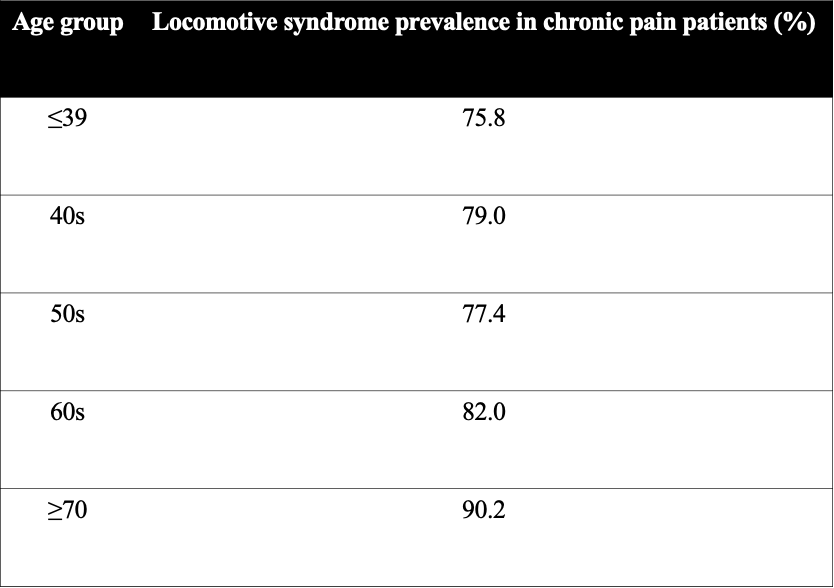
A table depicting the locomotive syndrome prevalence of chronic pain patients of different age groups according to a study in Japan.

Researchers have tried to determine whether there are variations in locomotive syndrome prevalence between sexes. Two surveys in Japan showed that locomotive syndrome prevalence in men was lower than that in women. A 2010 nationwide survey with participation of 4500 subjects in Japan showed the estimated locomotive syndrome prevalence for men and women to be 7.9% and 12.3% respectively. Moreover, another nationwide survey with 5162 subjects in 2014 showed the prevalence for men and women to be 10.8% and 12.9% respectively. Contrarily, a different study in Japan with participation of 963 subjects indicated that the difference in locomotive syndrome prevalence between men and women was not significant.

The prevalence of locomotive syndrome increases as people become older, with the highest in those aged 70 or above at 16%. Locomotive syndrome prevalence in people with chronic pain was eight times higher than that of the general population. In addition, the number of orthopaedic surgery treatments in need of hospitalisation drastically rises after age 50 and reaches a peak after the age of 70.

== Signs and symptoms ==
The main components in the locomotive system include intervertebral disks, joints, bones, nervous and muscular system. The deterioration of locomotive components leads to symptoms such as pain, limitation in joint mobility, malalignment, balance disorder and gait abnormality. Syndrome progression leads to reduced ability to perform activities of daily living independently and eventually results in decreased quality of life and necessity of nursing care. People with locomotive syndrome may not be able to accomplish everyday tasks such as putting socks on while standing on one leg, doing moderately intensive house chores, carrying home 5 pounds of shopping and walking nonstop for 15 minutes. They may also slip around or trip up the house and need to hold on to handrails for support whilst climbing up the stairs.

Degenerative changes in the main components of the locomotive system begin before middle age. Generally in the initial stages, the progression is slow and asymptomatic. The symptoms only become obvious when pathological degeneration changes become advanced.

== Causes and mechanism ==
Locomotive syndrome is generally caused by decreased strength of muscles and balance related to ageing and locomotive conditions such as osteoarthritis, osteoporosis and spondylosis. Muscle degeneration becomes more common in people aged 50 or above. On average, they lose 3% of their muscle strength annually. This hinders their ability to undertake several physical routine activities. Elderly people with osteoporosis and frailty have a higher risk of hip, vertebra, distal radius and humerus fractures. These fractures can cause pain at the fracture site. For osteoarthritis, which is a medical condition of the synovial joints, the abrasion and breakdown of hyaline cartilage and underlying bone can cause joint pain and thus limit movement. For spondylosis, pressure on the spine wears out the intervertebral discs and disfigures the bone, which causes serious pain and leads to restriction of motion.

Specifically in women, locomotive syndrome may be caused by reduced levels of bone density and physical activity that usually happen after menopause. Bone density level decreases as the level of oestrogen, a hormone essential for healthy bones, drops after menopause. This causes more bone resorption than formation. Additionally, women tend to have smaller bones and lower bone mass than men, which further increases the risk of locomotive syndrome. They may also suffer from insufficient nutrition due to dieting in order to be thin, which further contributes to weak bones.

== Diagnosis and assessment ==
The diagnosis and assessment of locomotive syndrome are done using the short test battery for locomotive syndrome (STBLS) established by the JOA. STBLS consists of the stand-up test, the two-step test and the 25-question Geriatric Locomotive Function Scale (GLFS-25). Results from STBL serve as a guide to assess the risk, presence and degree of locomotive syndrome. There are two stages of locomotive syndrome. Stage 1 indicates the beginning of mobility function decline and stage 2 indicates a progression of mobility function decline. Individuals with locomotive syndrome are categorised into one of the two stages depending on the scores of the three tests.

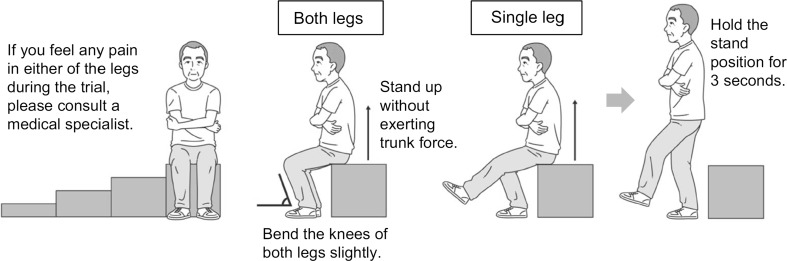
Illustration of the stand-up test

=== Stand-up test ===
The stand-up test examines and measures the vertical movement ability of the body and the muscle strength of the lower extremities. The test evaluates the ability to stand with one or both legs from stools of heights 10, 20, 30 and 40 cm. The difficulty level increases in order of decreasing stool height and when using one leg instead of two. The test is usually performed in increasing order of difficulty starting from standing up using both legs from a 40 cm high stool. The trial is successful if the individual can stand and hold their position for more than three seconds. The inability to stand up from a 40 cm tall stool using one leg is an indicator of stage 1 locomotive syndrome while the inability to stand up from a 20 cm tall stool using both legs is an indicator of stage 2 locomotive syndrome.

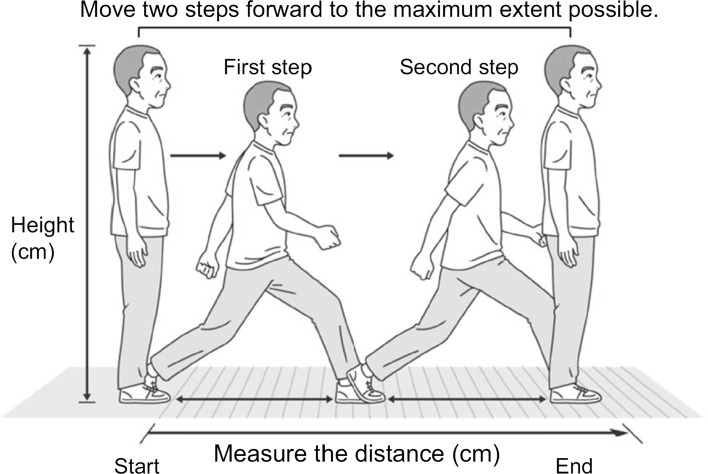
Illustration of the two-step test

=== Two-step test ===
The two-step test evaluates balance and walking ability by assessing gait speed and maximal step length. The test involves individuals taking two steps forward at maximum stride without losing balance and then standing still on both feet for more than three seconds. The distance covered by the two steps is measured and divided by the individual's height to obtain the two-step value which correlates with walking speed. The test is done twice and the highest value is noted. A score of less than 1.3 signifies stage 1 locomotive syndrome and a score of less than 1.1 signifies stage 2 locomotive syndrome.

=== GLFS-25 ===
The GLFS-25 is a self-administered questionnaire that evaluates pain, movement-related difficulty, social activity, cognitive status and daily activities of the middle-aged and elderly population. The scale consists of 25 questions referring to experiences in the preceding month that addresses four areas. This includes 4 questions about pain, 16 questions about pain during activities of daily living, 3 questions about social functions and 2 questions about mental health status. Each question is scored on a 5-point scale from 0 which indicates no impairment to 4 which indicates severe impairment. The total score which ranges from 0 to 100 serves as a quantitative evaluation of the difficulties and disabilities in activities of daily living related to the locomotor system. A GLFS-25 score of 7 or more is indicative of stage 1 locomotive syndrome and a score of 16 or more is indicative of stage 2 locomotive syndrome.

== Prevention and management ==
Strategies for preventing the onset and progression of locomotive syndrome include regular exercise and appropriate nutritional intake.

As exercise has been proven to significantly improve motor function and limit the decline of functional capacity, habitual exercise is the main method for locomotive syndrome prevention and improvement. The JOA proposed a set of exercises called locomotion training or locotra aimed for the improvement of physical function in the middle-aged and elderly population. Locotra consists of single-leg standing with eyes open, squats, heel raises and front lunges. These exercises help improve balance and muscle strength of the lower extremities which are vital for activities of daily living.

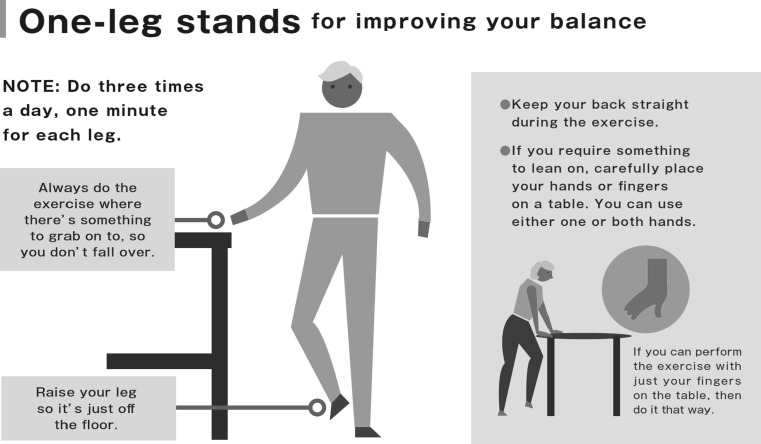
Illustration of single-leg standing exercise

=== Single-leg standing ===
Single-leg standing with eyes open is an exercise that effectively improves balance and prevents falls. Individuals are required to raise one foot by 5–10 cm with their eyes open for 1 minute. The exercise is to be done near a stable surface such as a desk to prevent falling. Three repetitions for each leg daily is recommended.

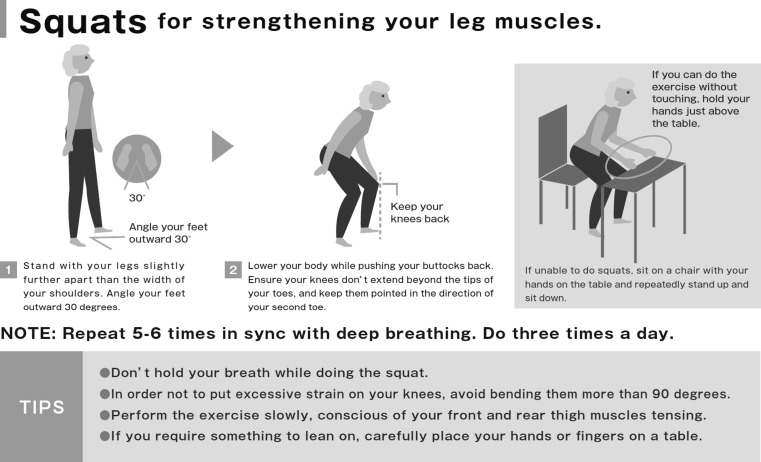
Illustration of squatting exercise

=== Squatting ===
Squatting has been proven to improve strength and balance of the lower body and independence of activities of daily living. Squatting involves lowering the torso from standing position and returning to the upright position. The proper squatting technique requires individuals to maintain the position of knees over the toes and the knee flexion angle below 90°. Three sets of 5-6 repetitions are recommended daily.

=== Heel raises ===
Heel raises involve raising and lowering the heels while standing on the balls of the feet. This exercise strengthens the triceps muscles of the lower extremities associated with gait speed and fall risk. Two or three sets of 10-20 repetitions are recommended daily.

=== Front lunges ===
Front lunges are performed by lowering the upper body slowly and bringing the body back up while keeping one foot forward in line with the back foot. Front lunges improve muscle strength, balance and flexibility of the lower extremities as most of the lower limb muscles are activated during the exercise. Two or three sets of 5-10 repetitions daily are recommended.

=== Nutrition ===
In addition to exercise, nutritional improvement helps in the improvement and sustainment of motor function. Maintaining a well-balanced diet and healthy body weight help keep the musculoskeletal system healthy. Overnutrition increases the risk of locomotive syndrome as extra body weight puts added strain on the back and knees. Oppositely, undernutrition reduces bone and muscle mass, leading to osteoporosis and sarcopenia. The JOA recommends eating three proper meals a day to obtain a balanced mix of the five major nutrients: carbohydrates, fat, protein, vitamins and minerals. These nutrients are essential for the proper maintenance of the locomotor system. A steady supply of calcium, protein, vitamin D and vitamin K are required for the constant regeneration of bones. 700–800 mg of calcium per day is recommended to prevent osteoporosis. Protein supplementation has been shown to have additive effects to exercise intervention. Vitamin D enhances calcium absorption in the gut and vitamin K plays a role in the formation of bones and the maintenance of bone quality. Other important nutrients involved in bone formation include magnesium, folic acid, vitamin B6 and vitamin B12. On the other hand, overconsumption of sodium, phosphate and caffeine hinders calcium absorption.

Protein and vitamin B6 also help in the formation and maintenance of muscles.
