= Sitting-rising test =

Clinical test for mortality risk

- Purpose: provides a significant and efficient prediction of mortality risk in elders

The sitting-rising test (SRT) is a clinical test which provides a significant and efficient prediction of mortality risk in the elderly. It was initially developed by Brazilian researchers in exercise physiology and sports medicine in the 1990s. The test involves sitting down on the floor, then returning to a standing position from the floor. Results are scored out of ten total points, divided between the two tasks.

A 2020 study with sex- and age-reference SRT scores derived from 6,141 adults appeared in the European Journal of Preventive Cardiology, with other evaluation charts in the supplemental materials.

== Procedure ==
The test itself is simple. Subjects are instructed by the evaluator to, "without worrying about the speed of movement, try to sit and then to rise from the floor, using the minimum support that you believe is needed."

=== Scoring ===
The maximum possible score on the SRT is 10 points: a possible total of 5 points for sitting down, and 5 points for rising from the floor to a standing position. Use of a hand, forearm, knee, or the side of the leg to press up from the ground—or bracing a hand on the knee—each result in a deduction of one point. The minimum possible score is 0 points. An additional 0.5 points is deducted if the evaluator perceives an unsteady execution or partial loss of balance. If the subject loses points on the first few attempts, the evaluator provides advice to help them improve their score on subsequent tries. The best scores for sitting and rising are used to determine the final score.

== Outcomes ==
A 2016 study, which aimed to assess the utility of the test for patients recovering from strokes, found that age was strongly associated with particular scores. This same study suggested 7.8 as a general cutoff score when differentiating between healthy older adults and those struggling with chronic stroke symptoms.

In another study of subjects between the ages of 51 and 80, those with scores in the lowest range (0 to 3) were 5–6 times more likely to die within the study period (about 6 years) than those in the group with the highest scores (8 to 10). Contrary to the suggestions of some headlines which imply that the test can predict mortality across all age groups in this way, that broad of a claim has not been suggested in, nor is it supported by, existing literature. Rather, the test is described as a potentially useful measure of "a physical function construct not captured by the other tests."

== See also ==
- Romberg's test
- Timed Up and Go test
- Tinetti test
