= Romberg's test =

Test used in an exam of neurological function for balance

- Spinal cord tracts. Blue are afferents; red are efferents
- Synonyms: Romberg maneuver
- Purpose: exam of neurological function for balance

Romberg's test, Romberg's sign, or the Romberg maneuver is a test used in an exam of neurological function for balance.

The Romberg test is a test of the body's sense of positioning (proprioception), which requires healthy functioning of the dorsal columns of the spinal cord.

The exam is based on the premise that a person requires at least two of the three following senses to maintain balance while standing:

- proprioception (the ability to know one's body position in space)
- vestibular function (the ability to know one's head position in space)
- vision (which can be used to monitor and adjust for changes in body position).

A patient who has a problem with proprioception can still maintain balance by using vestibular function and vision. In the Romberg test, the standing patient is asked to close their eyes. An increased loss of balance is interpreted as a positive Romberg's test.

The Romberg test is used to investigate the cause of loss of motor coordination (ataxia). A positive Romberg test suggests that the ataxia is sensory in nature, that is, depending on loss of proprioception. If a patient is ataxic and Romberg's test is not positive, it suggests that ataxia is cerebellar in nature, that is, depending on localized cerebellar dysfunction instead.

It is used as an indicator for possible alcohol or drug impaired driving and neurological decompression sickness. When used to test impaired driving, the test is performed with the subject estimating 30 seconds in their head. This is used to gauge the subject's internal clock and can be an indicator of stimulant or depressant use.

== Procedure ==
Ask the subject to stand erect with feet together and eyes closed. Stand close by as a precaution in order to stop the person from falling over. Watch the movement of the body in relation to a perpendicular object behind the subject (corner of the room, door, or window).

The essential features of the test are as follows:

1. the subject stands with feet together, eyes open and hands by the sides;
2. the subject closes the eyes while the examiner observes for a full minute.

Because the examiner is trying to elicit whether the patient falls when the eyes are closed, it is advisable to stand ready to catch the falling patient. For heavier subjects, a strong assistant is recommended.

Romberg's test is positive if the patient falls while the eyes are closed. Swaying is not a positive sign as it shows proprioceptive correction.

Patients with a positive result are said to demonstrate Romberg's sign or Rombergism. They can also be described as Romberg's positive. The basis of this test is that balance comes from the combination of several neurological systems, namely proprioception, vestibular input, and vision. If any two of these systems are working the person should be able to demonstrate a fair degree of balance. The key to the test is that vision is taken away by asking the patient to close their eyes. This leaves only two of the three systems remaining and if there is a vestibular disorder (labyrinthine) or a sensory disorder (proprioceptive dysfunction) the patient will become much more unbalanced.

== Physiology ==
Maintaining balance while standing in the stationary position relies on intact sensory pathways, sensorimotor integration centers and motor pathways.

The main sensory inputs are:

1. Joint position sense (proprioception), carried in the dorsal columns of the spinal cord, the dorsal and ventral spinocerebellar tracts.
2. Vision
3. Vestibular apparatus

Crucially, the brain can obtain sufficient information to maintain balance if any two of the three systems are intact.

Sensorimotor integration is carried out by the cerebellum and by the dorsal column-medial lemniscus tract. The motor pathway is the corticospinal (pyramidal) tract and the medial and lateral vestibular tracts.

The first stage of the test (standing with the eyes open with hands on hips), demonstrates that at least two of the three sensory pathways are intact, and that sensorimotor integration and the motor pathway are functioning. The patient must stand unsupported with eyes open and hands on hips for 30 seconds. If the patient takes a step or removes a hand from the hip, the timer is stopped. The patient may make two attempts to complete the 30 seconds.

Similar to the sensory organization test, the visual pathway would then be removed by closing the eyes. If the proprioceptive and vestibular pathways are intact, balance will be maintained. But if proprioception is defective, two of the sensory inputs will be absent and the patient will sway then fall. Similar to the Romberg Test, the patient must stand unsupported with eyes closed and hands on hips for 30 seconds. The patient may make two attempts to complete the 30 seconds.

A variation of the Romberg Test, the Sharpened Romberg Test, consists of narrowing the patient’s base of support by placing feet in a heel to toe position. Nonetheless, test instructions do not specify which foot, preferred or non-preferred, should be placed in front of the other. The patient should be instructed to keep hands on hips for the whole 30 seconds. If the patient takes a step or removes hands from hips, the timer is stopped and the patient may attempt the test one more time. The sharpened Romberg does have an early learning effect that will plateau between the third and fourth attempts.

=== Positive Romberg ===
Romberg's test is positive in conditions causing sensory ataxia such as:

- Vitamin deficiencies such as Vitamin B_{12}
- Conditions affecting the dorsal columns of the spinal cord, such as tabes dorsalis (neurosyphilis), in which it was first described.
- Conditions affecting the sensory nerves (sensory peripheral neuropathies), such as chronic inflammatory demyelinating polyradiculoneuropathy (CIDP).
- Friedreich's ataxia
- Ménière's disease

== Romberg and cerebellar function ==
Romberg's test is not a test of cerebellar function, as it is commonly misconstrued. Patients with severe cerebellar ataxia will generally be unable to balance even with their eyes open; therefore, the test cannot proceed beyond the first step and no patient with cerebellar ataxia can correctly be described as Romberg's positive. Rather, Romberg's test is a test of the proprioception receptors and pathways function. A positive Romberg's test which will show wide base gait in patients with back pain has been shown to be 90 percent specific for lumbar spinal stenosis.

== History ==
The test was named after the German neurologist Moritz Heinrich Romberg (1795–1873), who also gave his name to Parry–Romberg syndrome and Howship–Romberg sign.

== See also ==
- Posterior column–medial lemniscus pathway
- Sitting-rising test
- Timed Up and Go test
- Tinetti test
