= Parry–Romberg syndrome =

Very Rare disease involving degeneration of tissues beneath the skin

- Other names: Progressive hemifacial atrophy
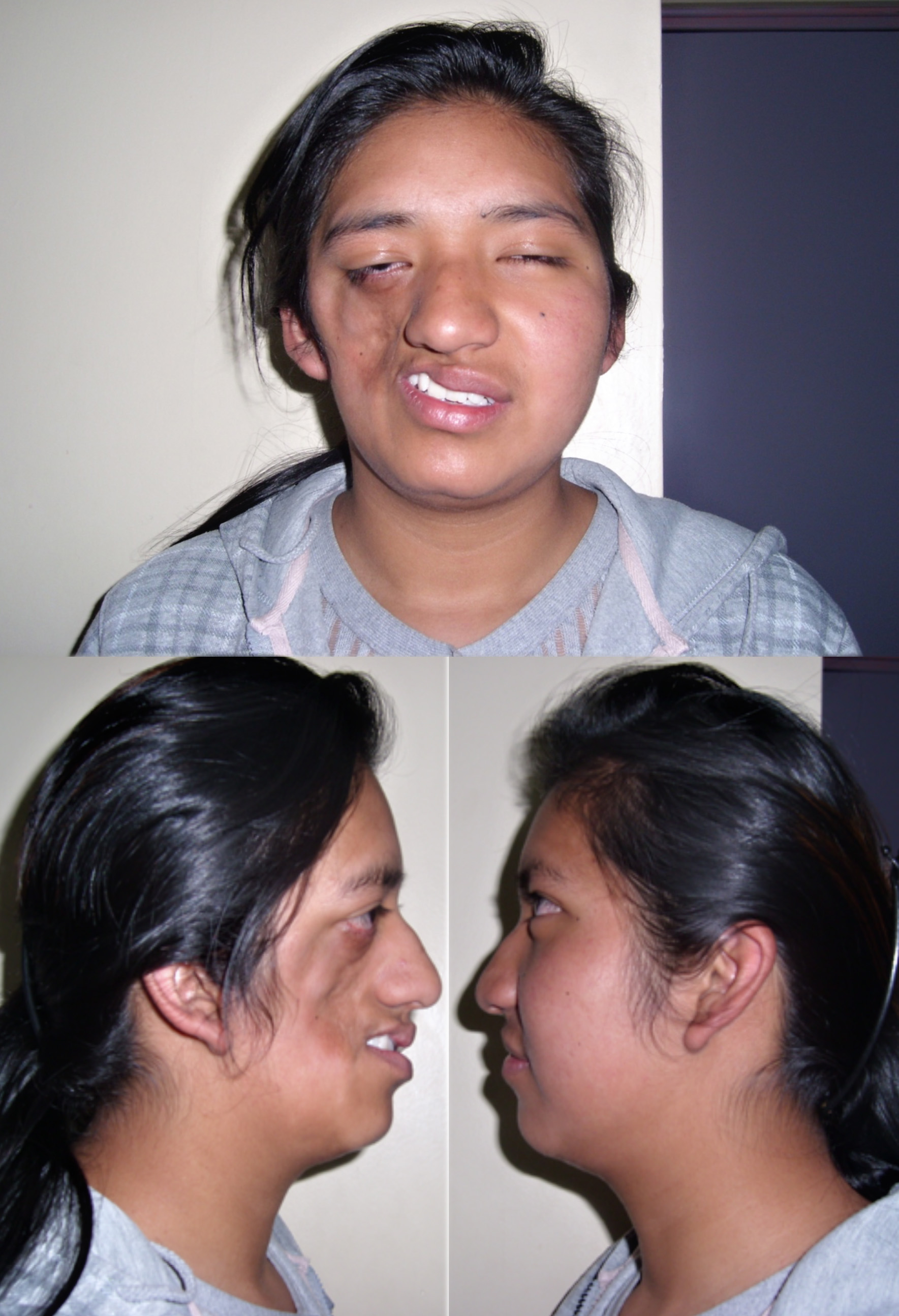
- a 17-year-old girl with Parry–Romberg syndrome. The subcutaneous tissue and underlying facial muscles on the right side of the face are severely atrophic, while the left side is unaffected.
- Specialty: Neurology
- Differential diagnosis: Goldenhar syndrome Hemifacial microsomia
- Named after: Caleb Hillier Parry; Moritz Heinrich Romberg

Parry–Romberg syndrome (PRS) is a rare disease presenting in early childhood characterized by progressive shrinkage and degeneration of the tissues beneath the skin, usually on only one side of the face (hemifacial atrophy) but occasionally extending to other parts of the body. An autoimmune mechanism is suspected, and the syndrome may be a variant of localized scleroderma, but the precise cause and pathogenesis of this acquired disorder remains unknown. The literature has reported it as a possible consequence of sympathectomy. The syndrome is more prevalent in females and typically appears between 5 and 15 years of age. There has been only one case report of the syndrome appearing in older adults: a 43-year-old woman with symptoms appearing at the age of 33.

In addition to the connective tissue disease, the condition is sometimes accompanied by neurological, ocular, and oral symptoms. The range and severity of associated symptoms and findings are highly variable.

== Signs and symptoms ==
=== Skin and connective tissues ===
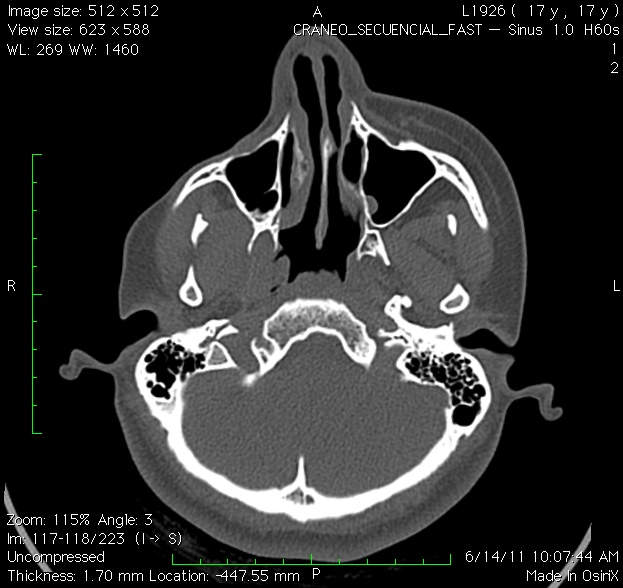
An axial CT scan of a 17-year-old girl with Parry–Romberg syndrome, showing severe loss of subcutaneous tissue and muscle of the right side of the face, with no apparent involvement of the facial bones

Initial facial changes usually involve the area of the face covered by the temporal or buccinator muscles. The disease progressively spreads from the initial site, causing atrophy of the skin and its adnexa, as well as underlying subcutaneous structures such as connective tissue (fat, fascia, cartilage, bones) and/or muscles on one side of the face. The mouth and nose are typically deviated towards the affected side of the face.

The process may eventually extend to involve tissues between the nose and the upper corner of the lip, the upper jaw, the angle of the mouth, the area around the eye and brow, the ear, and/or the neck. The syndrome often begins with a circumscribed patch of scleroderma in the frontal region of the scalp, with hair loss and a depressed linear scar extending down through the mid-face on the affected side. This scar is referred to as a "coup de sabre" lesion because it resembles the scar of a wound made by a sabre, and is indistinguishable from the scar observed in frontal linear scleroderma.

In 20% of cases, the hair and skin overlying affected areas may become hyperpigmented or hypopigmented with patches of unpigmented skin. In up to 20% of cases, the disease may involve the ipsilateral (on the same side) or the contralateral (on the opposite side) neck, trunk, arm, or leg. The cartilage of the nose, ear, and larynx can be involved. The disease has been reported to affect both sides of the face in 5 to 10% of cases.

Symptoms and physical findings usually become apparent during the first or early during the second decade of life. The average age of onset is nine years of age, and the majority of individuals experience symptoms before 20 years of age. The disease may progress for several years before eventually going into remission (abruptly ceasing).

=== Neurological ===
Neurological abnormalities are common. Roughly 45% of people with Parry–Romberg syndrome also have trigeminal neuralgia (severe pain in the tissues supplied by the ipsilateral trigeminal nerve, including the forehead, eye, cheek, nose, mouth and jaw) and/or migraine (severe headaches that may be accompanied by visual abnormalities, nausea and vomiting).

10% of affected individuals develop a seizure disorder as part of the disease. The seizures are typically Jacksonian in nature (characterized by rapid spasms of a muscle group that subsequently spread to adjacent muscles) and occur on the side contralateral to the affected side of the face. Half of these cases are associated with abnormalities in both the gray and white matter of the brain—usually ipsilateral but sometimes contralateral—that are detectable on magnetic resonance imaging (MRI) scan.

=== Ocular ===
Recession of the eyeball within the orbit is the most common eye abnormality observed in Parry–Romberg syndrome. It is caused by a loss of subcutaneous tissue around the orbit. Other common findings include drooping of the eyelid, constriction of the pupil, redness of the conjunctiva, and decreased sweating of the affected side of the face. Collectively, these signs are referred to as Horner's syndrome. Other ocular abnormalities include ophthalmoplegia (paralysis of one or more of the extraocular muscles) and other types of strabismus, uveitis, and heterochromia of the iris.

=== Oral ===
The tissues of the mouth, including the tongue, gingiva, teeth, and soft palate, are commonly involved in Parry–Romberg syndrome. 50% of affected individuals develop dental abnormalities such as delayed eruption, dental root exposure, or resorption of the dental roots on the affected side. 35% have difficulty or inability to normally open the mouth or other jaw symptoms, including temporomandibular joint dysfunction and spasm of the muscles of mastication on the affected side. 25% experience atrophy of one side of the upper lip and tongue.

== Causes ==
The fact that some people affected with this disease have circulating antinuclear antibodies in their serum supports the theory that Parry–Romberg syndrome may be an autoimmune disease, specifically a variant of localized scleroderma. Several cases have been reported affecting more than one family member, prompting speculation of an autosomal dominant inheritance pattern. However, at least one report of monozygotic twins in which only one twin was affected has occurred, casting doubt on this theory. Further, the National Organization for Rare Disorders has stated there is currently no evidence that Parry–Romberg syndrome is genetic or that it can be passed on to children. Various other theories about the cause and pathogenesis have been suggested, including alterations in the peripheral sympathetic nervous system (perhaps as a result of trauma or infection involving the cervical plexus or the sympathetic trunk), as the literature reported it following sympathectomy, disorders in migration of cranial neural crest cells, or chronic cell-mediated inflammatory process of the blood vessels. The condition likely results from different mechanisms in different people, with all of these factors potentially being involved.

== Diagnosis ==
Diagnosis can be made solely based on the history and physical examination in people who present with only facial asymmetry. For those who report neurological symptoms such as migraine or seizures, an MRI scan of the brain is the imaging modality of choice. A diagnostic lumbar puncture and serum test for autoantibodies may also be indicated in people who present with a seizure disorder of recent onset. Oligoclonal bands and an elevated IgG index may be found in 50% of the patients.

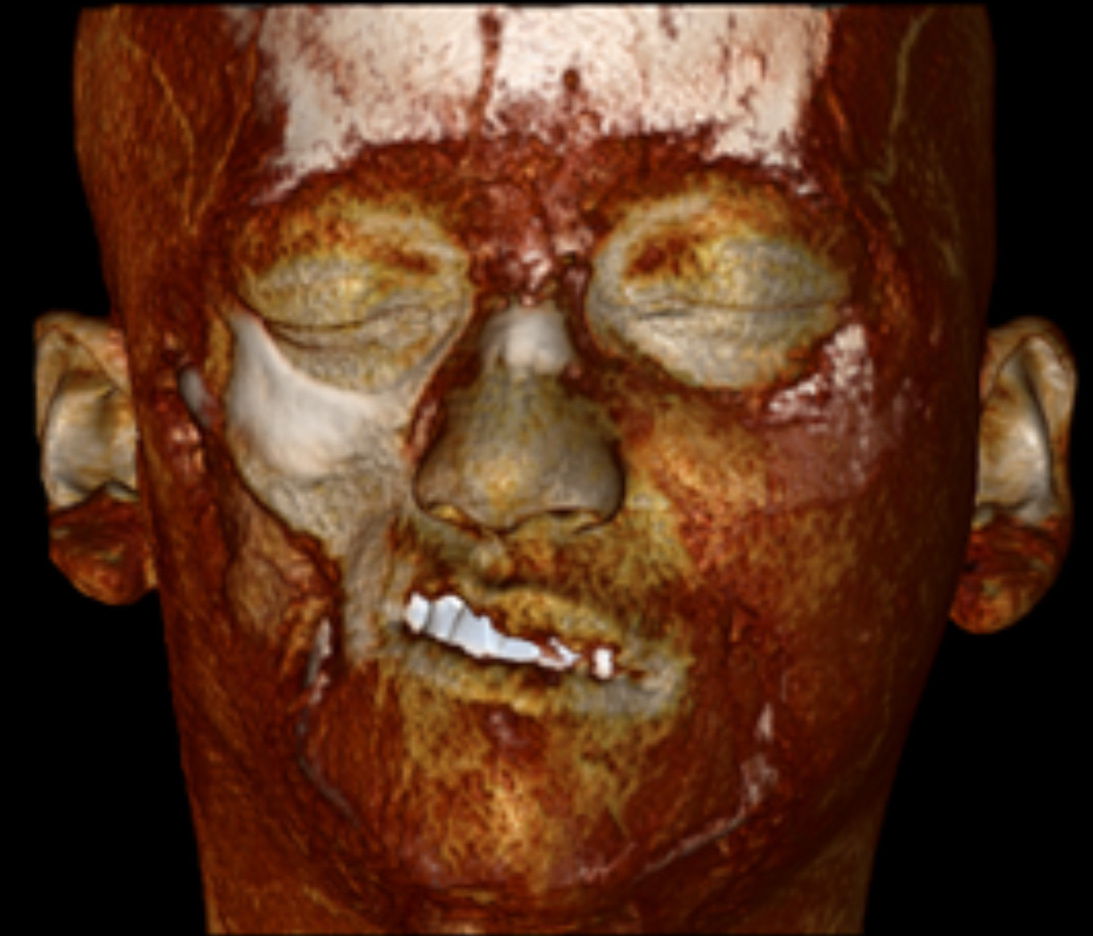
A 3D, soft tissue reconstruction of a CT scan of a 17-year-old girl with Parry Romberg syndrome.

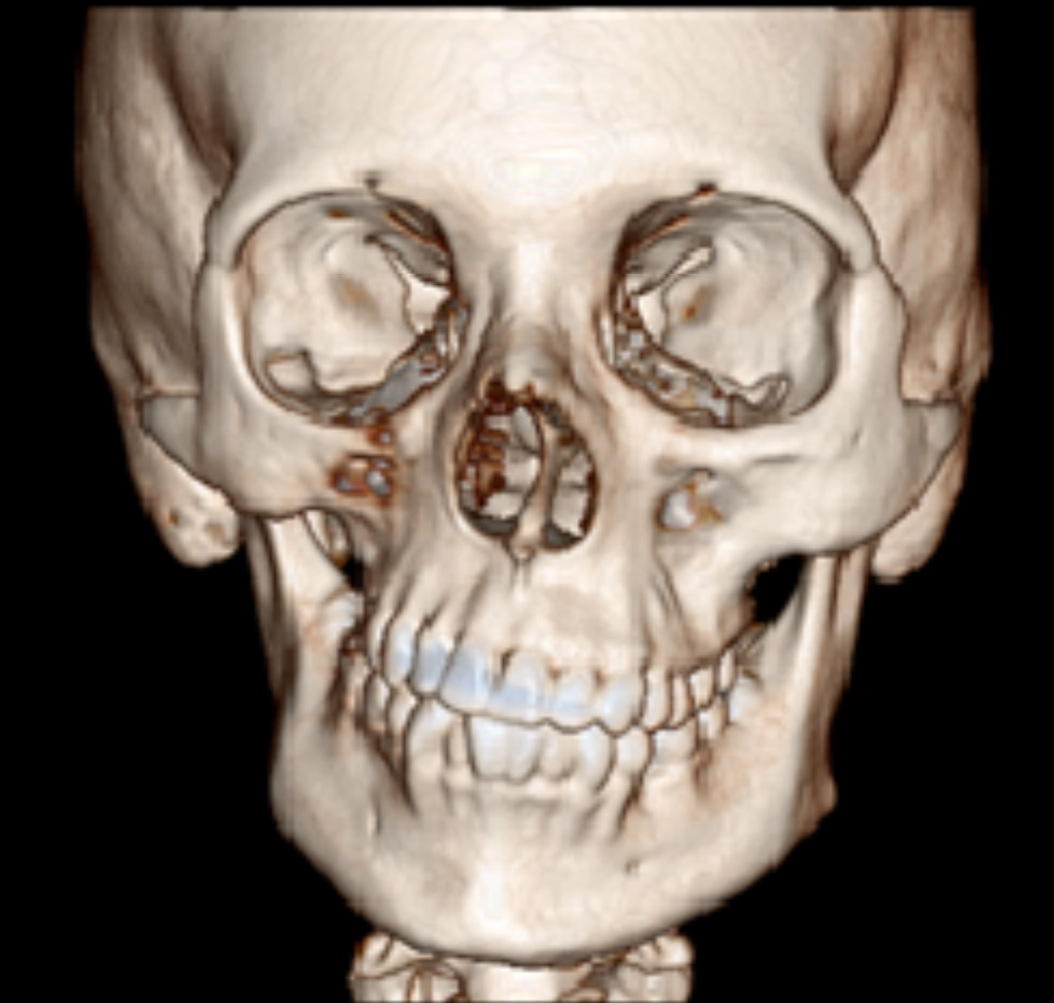
CT scan 3D bone reconstruction of a 17-year-old girl with Parry Romberg syndrome.

== Management ==
=== Medical ===
Medical management may involve immunosuppressive drugs such as methotrexate, corticosteroids, cyclophosphamide, and azathioprine. No randomized controlled trials have yet been conducted to evaluate such treatments, so the benefits have not been clearly established.

=== Surgical ===
Affected individuals may benefit from autologous fat transfer or fat grafts to restore a more normal contour to the face. However, greater volume defects may require microsurgical reconstructive surgery, which may involve the transfer of an island parascapular fasciocutaneous flap or a free flap from the groin, rectus abdominis muscle (Transverse Rectus Abdominis Myocutaneous or "TRAM" flap) or latissimus dorsi muscle to the face. Severe deformities may require additional procedures, such as pedicled temporal fascia flaps, cartilage grafts, bone grafts, orthognathic surgery, and bone distraction. The timing of surgical intervention is controversial; some surgeons prefer to wait until the disease has run its course while others recommend early intervention.

== Epidemiology ==
Parry–Romberg syndrome appears to occur randomly and for unknown reasons. Prevalence is higher in females than males, with a ratio of roughly 3:2. The condition is observed on the left side of the face about as often as on the right side.

== History ==
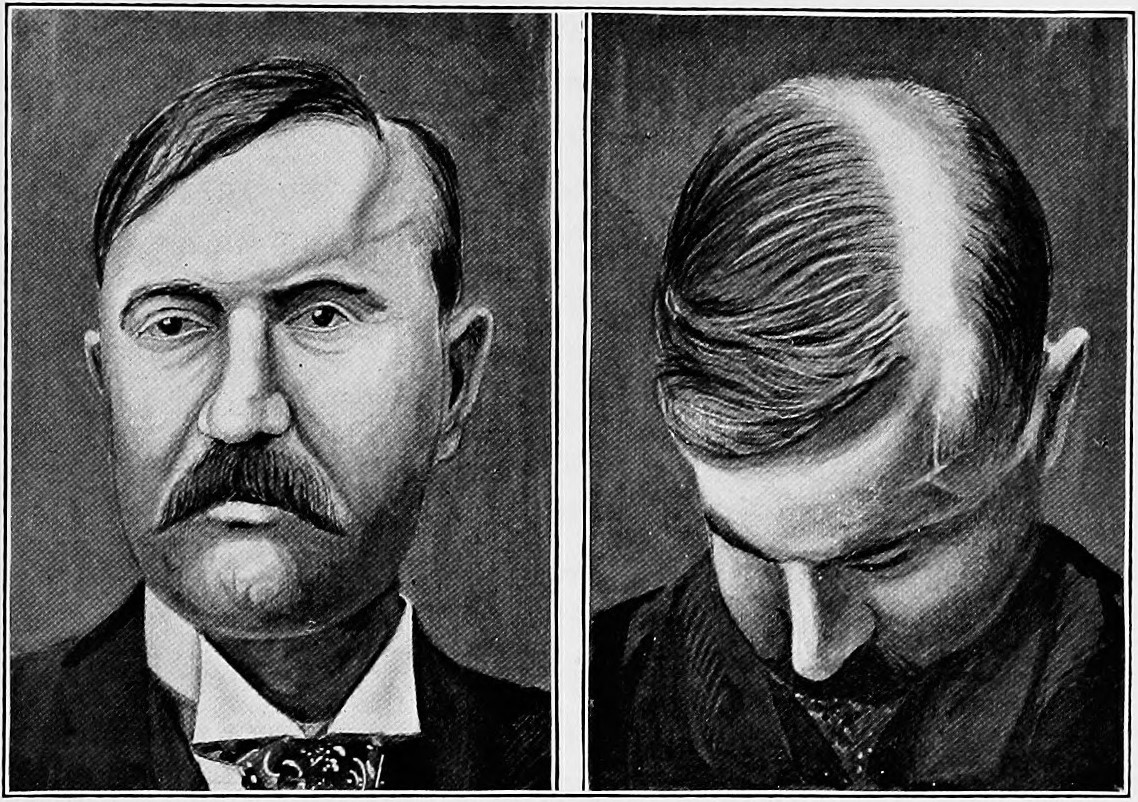
Hemifacial atrophy of the forehead and scalp, 1897

The disease was first described in 1825 by Caleb Hillier Parry (1755–1822), in a collection of his medical writings which were published posthumously by his son Charles Henry Parry (1779–1860). It was described a second time in 1846 by Moritz Heinrich Romberg (1795–1873) and Eduard Heinrich Henoch (1820–1910). German neurologist Albert Eulenburg (1840–1917) was the first to use the descriptive title "progressive hemifacial atrophy" in 1871.

== See also ==
- Hemifacial microsomia
- List of skin conditions
- Trigeminal trophic syndrome
