= Moritz Heinrich Romberg =

German physician (1795–1873)

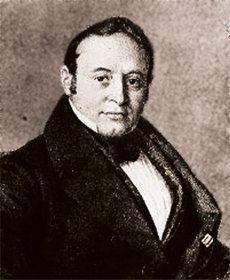
Moritz Heinrich Romberg

Moritz Heinrich Romberg (11 November 1795 – 16 June 1873) was a German medical doctor and neurologist who published a classic multi-volume textbook between 1840 and 1846. Considered a pioneer of neurology, he was the first to describe Romberg's sign, a medical sign of impaired proprioception in a patient.

Romberg was born in Meiningen, a town in Thuringia, Germany. Romberg faced early hardship with the death of his father, a Jewish merchant. Following this tragedy, his mother relocated with Romberg and his younger sister to Berlin. It was in Berlin that Romberg spent the rest of his life, eventually making significant contributions in the field of neurology.

He described what is now known as "Romberg's sign" in his original account of tabes dorsalis (a disease caused by syphilis damaging the back of the spinal cord). He related early symptoms as: "The feet feel numbed in standing, walking or lying down, and the patient has the sensation as if they were covered in fur; the resistance of the ground is not felt..."

Romberg's sign he described as: "The gait begins to be insecure... he puts down his feet with greater force...The individual keeps his eyes on his feet to prevent his movements from becoming still more unsteady. If he is ordered to close his eyes while in the erect posture, he at once commences to totter and swing from side to side; the insecurity of his gait also exhibits itself more in the dark." Romberg had not observed this in other paralyses.

The unsteadiness with eyes closed (sensory ataxia), relates to loss of sense of position in the legs and feet that are normally compensated for by the patient who uses vision to provide that information. But when the eyes are closed or in the dark, the loss of sense of position causes unsteadiness and sometimes falls, as Romberg described.

He was one of a few number of innovative neurologists in Europe who in the 1820-50 period introduced clinical observation and deduction into what was then an elementary discipline. He is credited with having been "the first clinical neurologist".

Edward Henry Sieveking translated Romberg's Lehrbuch der Nervenkrankheiten des Menschen into English in 1853.

Romberg's nephew Eduard Heinrich Henoch was a physician who became known for describing Henoch–Schönlein purpura.

== See also ==
- Parry–Romberg syndrome
