= Sensory ataxia =

Symptom and sign in neurology

Sensory ataxia is both a symptom and a sign in neurology. It is a form of ataxia (loss of coordination) caused not by cerebellar dysfunction but by loss of sensory input into the control of movement.

Sensory ataxia is distinguished from cerebellar ataxia by the presence of near-normal coordination when the movement is visually observed by the patient, but marked worsening of coordination when the eyes are shut, indicating a positive Romberg's sign.

Sensory ataxia also lacks the associated features of cerebellar ataxia such as pendular tendon reflexes, scanning dysarthria, nystagmus and broken pursuit eye movements.

Patients with sensory ataxia often demonstrate pseudoathetosis and Romberg's sign. They usually complain of loss of balance in the dark, typically when closing their eyes in the shower or removing clothing over the head.

== Causes ==
Sensory ataxia can be a manifestation of sensory large fiber peripheral neuropathies and conditions causing dysfunction of the dorsal columns of the spinal cord due to a variety of disorders: infectious, auto-immune, metabolic, toxic, vascular and hereditary diseases.
