= Georg Axhausen =

German oral and maxillofacial surgeon

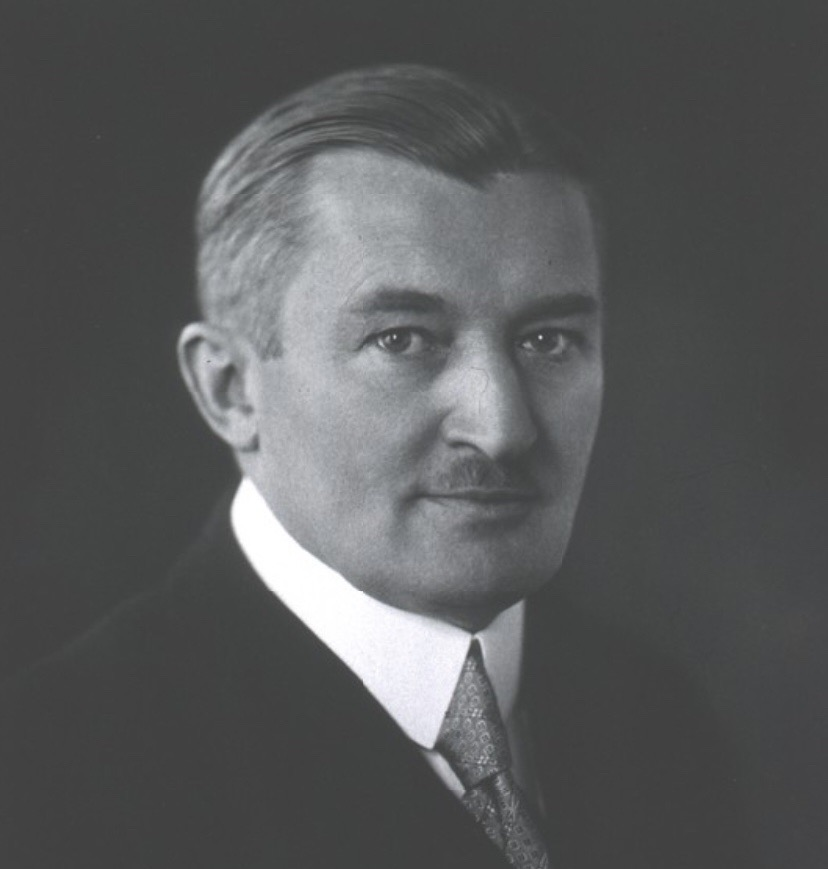
- Born: Georg Richard Otto Axhausen; 24 March 1877; Landsberg an der Warthe, Prussia, German Empire
- Died: 10 January 1960 (aged 82); West Berlin, West Germany
- Education: Kaiser Wilhelm Academy
- Occupations: Surgeon, professor
- Known for: Avascular necrosis
- Medical career
- Institutions: Humboldt University; University of Kiel
- Sub-specialties: Oral surgery; dentistry

Georg Axhausen (24 March 1877 – 10 January 1960) was a German oral and maxillofacial surgeon.

Axhausen studied medicine at Kaiser-Wilhelms-Akademie (Pépinière) in Berlin, receiving his doctorate in 1901. Later on, he worked in the surgical clinic at Kiel under Heinrich Helferich (1904–06) and in the institute of pathology at Friedrichshain Hospital in Berlin under Ludwig Pick (1907/08). From 1909 to 1924 he worked in the surgical clinic at the Berlin-Charité.

In 1908, he obtained his habilitation, and four years later became an associate professor at Berlin. In 1928, he was named a full professor and director of the dental institute at the Charité.

Axhausen was a critic of Nazi policies. His public opposition to sterilisation for people with cleft palate and other abnormalities led to a forced early retirement in 1939, though he was invited back to his teaching position in 1946 after the end of the war.

He specialized in pathology and surgery of bones and joints, being known for his pioneering studies in bone grafting and necrosis of the epiphysis. He is credited with introducing the term "aseptic necrosis", which is now referred to as avascular necrosis. The eponymous "Axhausen operation" is a procedure for closure of cleft palate.

== Selected works ==
- Die Kriegswundbehandlung im Kiefer-Gesichtsbereich, 1941 – War wound treatment in the jaw-facial area.
- Die allgemeine Chirurgie in der Zahn-, Mund- und Kieferheilkunde, 1943 – General surgery in dentistry, oral and maxillofacial surgery.
- Leitfaden der zahnärztlichen Chirurgie : Einführung in die klinische Zahnheilkunde für Studierende der Medizin und der Zahnheilkunde in 16 Vorlesungen, 1950 – Guide to dental surgery: Introduction to clinical dentistry for students of medicine and dentistry in 16 lectures.
- Technik und Ergebnisse der Spaltplastiken, 1952.
