= Burckhardt Helferich =

German chemist (1887–1982)

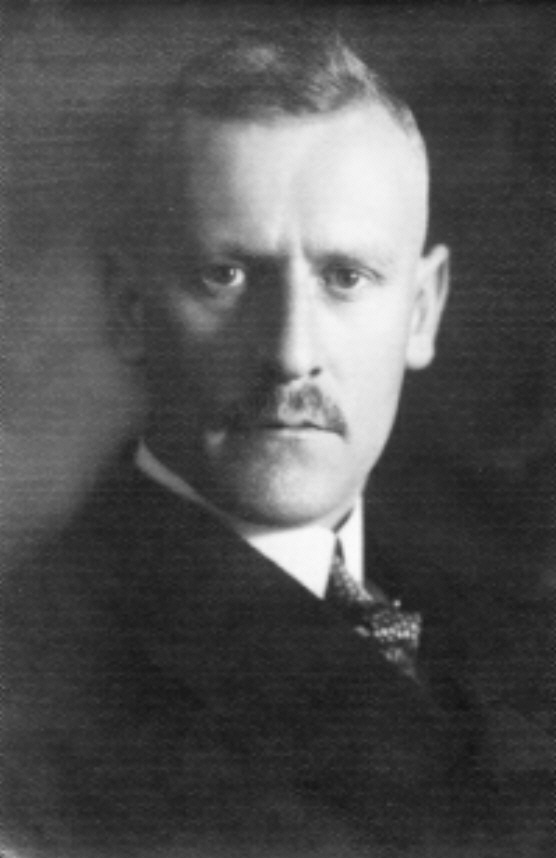
- Burckhardt Helferich (1920)
- Born: June 10, 1887; Greifswald, Germany
- Died: July 5, 1982 (aged 95); Bonn, Germany
- Education: University of Lausanne, Technical University of Munich, Technische Universität Berlin
- Known for: Synthesis of Gentiobiose
- Awards: Order of Merit of the Federal Republic of Germany
- Scientific career
- Workplaces: Goethe University Frankfurt, University of Greifswald, University of Leipzig, University of Bonn
- Thesis: Synthese einiger neuer Glucoside (1911)
- Doctoral advisor: Emil Fischer
- Notable students: Reinhard W. Hoffmann

Burckhardt Helferich (10 June 1887, in Greifswald – 5 July 1982, in Bonn) was a German chemist.

== Biography ==
He was the son of surgery professor Heinrich Helferich (1851–1945). He studied science, especially Geology, at the University of Lausanne in Switzerland and from 1907 chemistry in Munich and Berlin. In Berlin, Helferich was advised by Emil Fischer and later became his assistant.

He became a professor of organic chemistry in Frankfurt before succeeding Rudolf Pummerer at the University of Greifswald. In 1930 he was called by the University of Leipzig to succeed Arthur Hantzsch as director of the Chemistry Institute from 1930 to 1945. Helferich escaped Leipzig, and the American occupying forces evacuated him to Weilburg in 1945. In 1947 he became a professor at the University of Bonn, serving as rector in 1954/55.

In 1951 he was awarded the Emil-Fischer-Medaille. In 1957 he won an Order of Merit of the Federal Republic of Germany (Commander's Cross). Helferich was voted into the German Academy of Sciences and was made an honorary doctor of the University of Stuttgart. Between 1911 and his retirement in 1974 he authored over 300 academic papers.

His most famous student was Reinhard W. Hoffmann (b. 1933), professor of chemistry at Philipps-Universität Marburg.

Since 2005, The University of Leipzig awards a Burckhardt-Helferich-Prize.

== Bibliography ==
- Hermann Stetter: Burckhardt Helferich. 1887–1982. In: Chemische Berichte. Vol. 118, Nr. 1, 1985, p. I-XIX
