= Eduard Heinrich Henoch =

German physician (1820–1910)

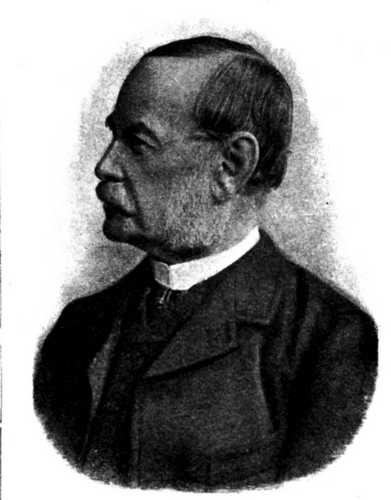
Eduard Heinrich Henoch.

Eduard Heinrich Henoch (June 16, 1820 Berlin – August 26, 1910) was a German physician. He taught at the Berlin University (1868–1894). Henoch was of Jewish descent, and was the nephew of Moritz Heinrich Romberg.

== Work ==
After taking the degree of M.D. at Berlin (1843), he began to practise as a specialist in diseases of children. Until 1850 he was assistant at the children's dispensary of the university. In that year he became privat-docent; in 1858, assistant professor. In 1872 Henoch became director of the hospital and dispensary of the department of pediatrics at the Charité. In 1893 he resigned that position, received the title of Medicinalrath, and lived in retirement at Meran until 1898, when he removed to Dresden.

In 1868 he described the association of colic, bloody diarrhea, painful joints, and rash in the condition, previously described by his former medical school teacher Johann Lukas Schönlein, of the allergic non-thrombopenic purpural rash that became known as Henoch–Schönlein purpura, though now known as IgA vasculitis.

== Literary works ==
Among his works may be mentioned:

- "Klinik der Unterleibskrankheiten," 3 vols., Berlin, 1852–58, 3d ed. 1863;
- "Beiträge zur Kinderheilkunde," two parts, ib. 1861–68;
- "Vorlesungen über Kinderkrankheiten," ib. 1881, 10th ed. 1899.
- translated from the English of Budd "Die Krankheiten der Leber," Berlin, 1846,
- edited Karl Friedrich Canstatt's "Handbuch der Medizinischen Klinik," Erlangen, 1854–56
- West's "Pathologie und Therapie der Kinderkrankheiten," 4th ed., Berlin, 1865.
