= Tinetti test =

- Synonyms: Performance Oriented Mobility Assessment
- Purpose: assessing a person's static and dynamic balance abilities.

The Tinetti Test (TT), or Performance Oriented Mobility Assessment (POMA), is a common clinical test for assessing a person's static and dynamic balance abilities. It is named after one of the inventors, Mary Tinetti. The test is in two short sections that contain one examining static balance abilities in a chair and then standing, and the other gait. The two sections are sometimes used as separate tests.

It has numerous other names, including Tinetti Gait and Balance Examination, Tinetti's Mobility Test, and Tinetti Balance Test; the wide variation in naming, test sections and cut off values sometimes cause confusion.

== See also ==
- Romberg's test
- Sitting-rising test
- Timed Up and Go test
