= Heinrich Helferich =

German surgeon (1851–1945)

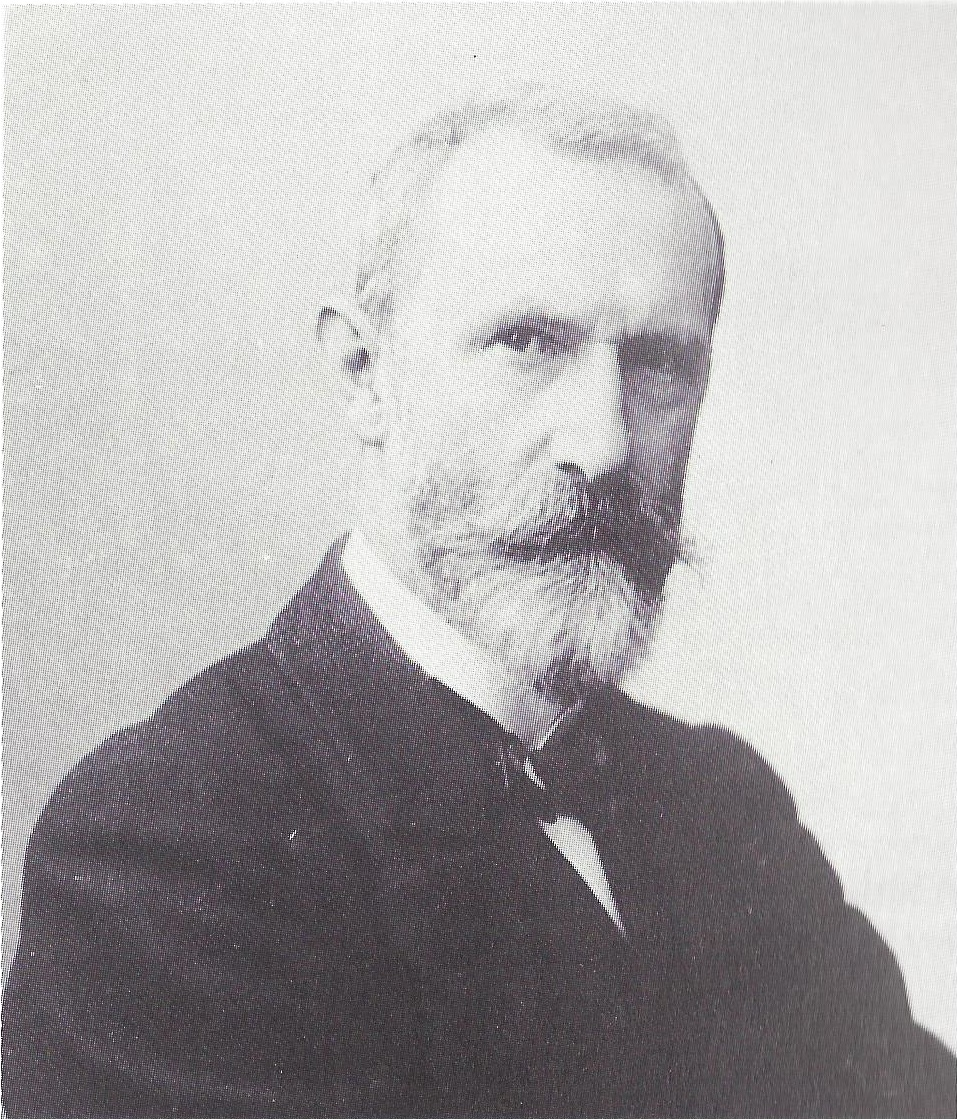
Heinrich Helferich

Heinrich Helferich (4 May 1851 in Tübingen – 18 December 1945 in Eisenach) was a German surgeon. He was the father of chemist Burckhardt Helferich (1887–1982).

He studied medicine at the Ludwig-Maximilians-Universität München and Leipzig University, receiving his doctorate at the Ludwig-Maximilians-Universität München in 1874. Following graduation, he worked as an assistant to Christian Wilhelm Braune and Karl Thiersch at Leipzig University, obtaining his habilitation for surgery in 1877. In 1879, he returned to the Ludwig-Maximilians-Universität München as director of the university surgical polyclinic. In 1884, he became an associate professor, and during the following year, relocated to the University of Greifswald as a full professor and director of the surgical clinic. In 1899, he succeeded Friedrich von Esmarch as chair of surgery at Kiel University.

== Principal works ==
- Die antiseptische Wundbehandlung in ihren Erfolgen und Wirkungen, 1892 – Antiseptic wound treatment, results and actions.
- Atlas und Grundriss der traumatischen Frakturen und Luxationen (7th edition, 1906). Translated into English as Atlas and epitome of traumatic fractures and dislocations, (1902).
