= Journal of Orthopaedic Surgery and Research =

- Discipline: Orthopedic surgery
- Language: English
- Edited by: Nicola Maffulli

Publication details
- History: 2006-present
- Publisher: BioMed Central
- Impact factor: 1.907 (2018)

Standard abbreviations
- ISO 4: J. Orthop. Surg. Res.

Indexing
- ISSN: 1749-799X
- LCCN: 2006243914
- OCLC no.: 71838423

Links
- Journal homepage; Online archive

The Journal of Orthopaedic Surgery and Research is a peer-reviewed open access medical journal covering orthopedic surgery and the general study of the musculoskeletal system. It was established in 2006 and is published by BioMed Central. The editor-in-chief is Nicola Maffulli (Queen Mary University of London). According to the Journal Citation Reports, the journal has a 2018/2019 impact factor of 1.907.
