= Hypervitaminosis =

Vitamin overdose
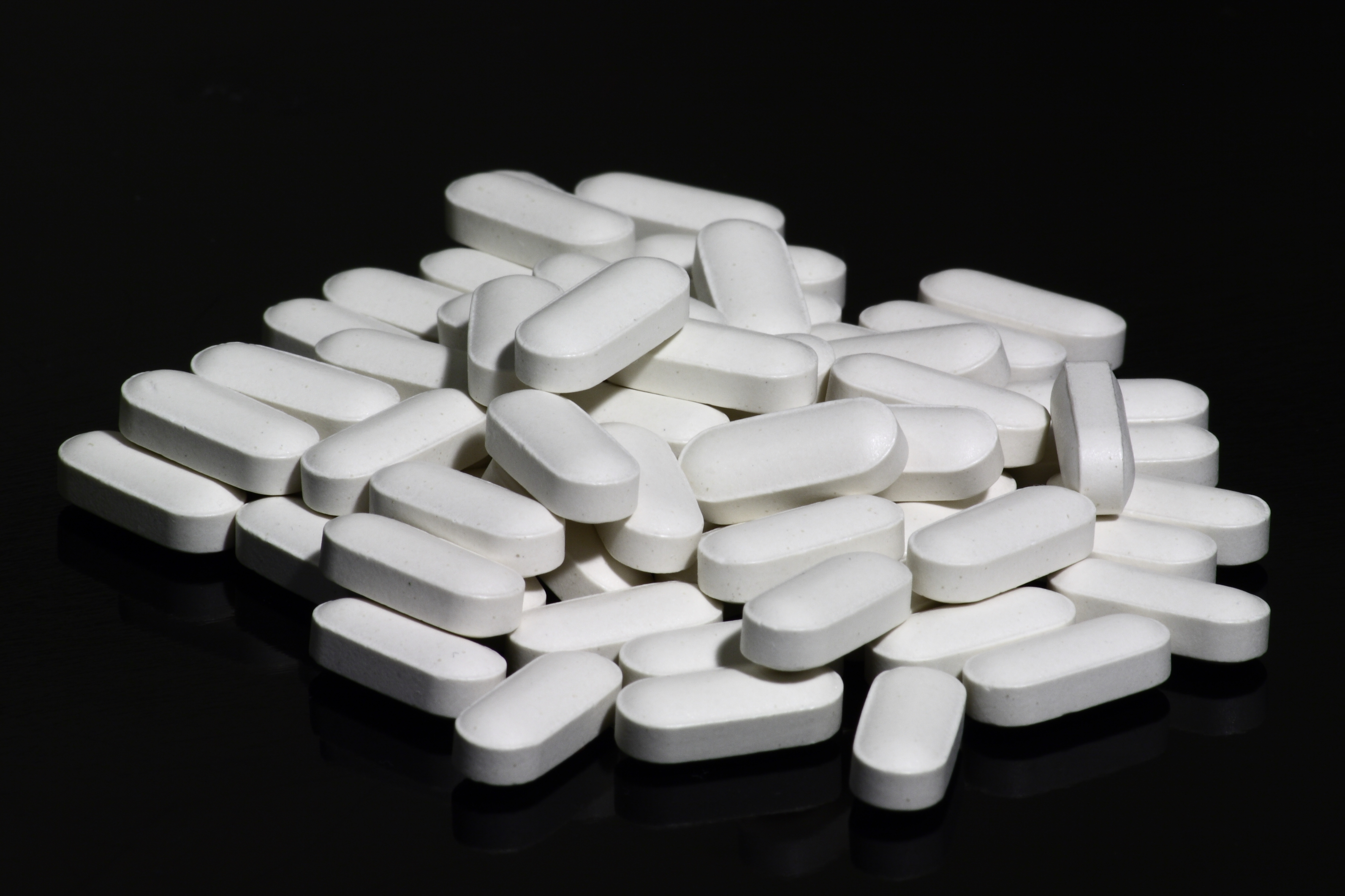
- Supplements of calcium and vitamin D
- Specialty: Toxicology
- Causes: Excessive consumption of vitamins

Hypervitaminosis is a condition of abnormally high storage levels of vitamins, which can lead to various symptoms—whether physiological, such as pain, nausea, and tachycardia, or psychological, such as confusion, hyperactivity, and irritability—and even to toxicity. Specific medical names of the different conditions are derived from the given vitamin involved: an excess of vitamin A, for example, is called hypervitaminosis A. Hypervitaminoses are primarily caused by fat-soluble vitamins (especially D and A), as these are stored by the body for longer than the water-soluble vitamins.

Generally, toxic levels of vitamins stem from high supplement intake. Toxicities of fat-soluble vitamins can also be caused by a large intake of highly fortified foods, but natural foods in modest levels seldom deliver extreme or dangerous levels of these vitamins. The Dietary Reference Intake recommendations issued by the United States Department of Agriculture define a "tolerable upper intake level" for most vitamins.

Those who are entirely healthy and do not experience long periods of avitaminosis can avert vitamin overdose by not taking more than the normal or recommended amount listed on the container of any multi-vitamin supplement and not concurrently ingesting multiple vitamin-containing supplements containing the same vitamins.

== Signs and symptoms ==
A few described symptoms:

- Frequent urination or cloudy urine
- Increased urine amount
- Eye irritation and/or increased sensitivity to light
- Irregular and/or rapid heartbeat
- Bone and joint pain (associated with avitaminosis)
- Muscle pain
- Confusion and mood changes (e.g. irritability, inability to focus)
- Convulsions
- Fatigue
- Headache
- Flushing of skin (associated with niacin (vitamin B3) overdose)
- Skin disturbances (e.g. dryness, itching, cracking of skin, rashes, increased sensitivity to sun)
- Changes of hair texture (e.g. thickening and/or clumping of hair)
- Appetite loss
- Constipation (associated with iron or calcium overdose)
- Nausea and vomiting
- Diarrhoea
- Moderate weight loss (more commonly seen in long-term overdose cases)

== Causes ==
With few exceptions, like some vitamins from B-complex, hypervitaminosis usually occurs with the fat-soluble vitamins A and D, which are stored, respectively, in the liver and fatty tissues of the body. These vitamins build up and remain for a longer time in the body than water-soluble vitamins. Conditions include:

- Hypervitaminosis A
- Hypervitaminosis D
- Vitamin B_{3} § Toxicity
- Megavitamin-B_{6} syndrome
- Vitamin E toxicity

== Prevention ==
Prevention in healthy individuals not having any periods of avitaminosis or vitamin (vegetables) lack for 2 years at least is by not taking more than the expected normal or recommended amount of vitamin supplements.

== Epidemiology ==
In the United States, overdose exposure to all formulations of "vitamins" (which includes multi-vitamin/mineral products) was reported by 62,562 individuals in 2004 with nearly 80% of these exposures in children under the age of 6, leading to 53 "major" life-threatening outcomes and 3 deaths (2 from vitamins D and E; 1 from a multivitamin with iron). This may be compared to the 19,250 people who died of unintentional poisoning of all kinds in the U.S. in the same year (2004). In 2016, overdose exposure to all formulations of vitamins and multi-vitamin/mineral formulations was reported by 63,931 individuals to the American Association of Poison Control Centers with 72% of these exposures in children under the age of five. No deaths were reported.

== See also ==
- Avitaminosis
- Megavitamin therapy
- Vitamin C megadosage
