= Pseudoathetosis =

- Specialty: Neurology

Pseudoathetosis is abnormal writhing movements, usually of the fingers, caused by a failure of joint position sense (proprioception) and indicates disruption of the proprioceptive pathway, from nerve to parietal cortex.

== Presentation ==
Analogous to Romberg's sign, the abnormal posturing is most pronounced when the eyes are closed as visual inputs are unavailable to guide corrective movements. Paradoxically, eye closure may decrease the amount of movement as the visual cues probably trigger corrective movements which return the limb to the desired "baseline" allowing a new phase of involuntary drift before a subsequent corrective phase occurs.

== Variants ==
Hemipseudaoathetosis refers to pseudoathetosis on one side of the body, usually the upper limb and is most commonly caused by a lesion affecting the cuneate tract or cuneate nucleus in the cervical spine or lower brainstem (medulla) respectively.

== Diagnosis ==
=== Differential diagnosis ===
It may be mistaken for choreoathetosis; but these abnormal movements are relatively constant irrespective of whether the eyes are open or closed, and they occur in the absence of proprioceptive loss.
