= Floor effect =

Source of bias during data gathering in statistics

In statistics, a floor effect (also known as a basement effect) arises when a data-gathering instrument has a lower limit to the data values it can reliably specify. This lower limit is known as the "floor". The "floor effect" is one type of scale attenuation effect; the other scale attenuation effect is the "ceiling effect". Floor effects are occasionally encountered in psychological testing, when a test designed to estimate some psychological trait has a minimum standard score that may not distinguish some test-takers who differ in their responses on the test item content. Giving preschool children an IQ test designed for adults would likely show many of the test-takers with scores near the lowest standard score for adult test-takers (IQ 40 on most tests that were currently normed as of 2010). To indicate differences in current intellectual functioning among young children, IQ tests specifically for young children are developed, on which many test-takers can score well above the floor score. An IQ test designed to help assess intellectually disabled persons might intentionally be designed with easier item content and a lower floor score to better distinguish among individuals taking the test as part of an assessment process.

== See also ==
- Ceiling effect (statistics)
- Bias (statistics)
