= Overnutrition =

Form of malnutrition

Overnutrition (also known as hyperalimentation) is a form of malnutrition in which the intake of nutrients is oversupplied. The amount of nutrients exceeds the amount required for normal growth, development, and metabolism.

Overnutrition can lead to:

- Obesity, a disorder which occurs by eating more calories than one burns, as well as:
- Oversupplying a specific nutrient, such as dietary minerals or vitamin poisoning.

For mineral excess, see:

- Iron poisoning, and
- Low sodium diet (a response to excess sodium).

Overnutrition may also refer to greater food consumption than appropriate, as well as other feeding procedures such as parenteral nutrition.

== See also ==
- Undernutrition
- Calorie restriction
