= Ceiling effect (statistics) =

Scale attenuation effect in statistics

The "ceiling effect" is one type of scale attenuation effect; the other scale attenuation effect is the "floor effect". The ceiling effect is observed when an independent variable no longer has an effect on a dependent variable, or the level above which variance in an independent variable is no longer measurable. The specific application varies slightly in differentiating between two areas of use for this term: pharmacological or statistical. An example of use in the first area, a ceiling effect in treatment, is pain relief by some kinds of analgesic drugs, which have no further effect on pain above a particular dosage level (see also: ceiling effect in pharmacology). An example of use in the second area, a ceiling effect in data-gathering, is a survey that groups all respondents into income categories, not distinguishing incomes of respondents above the highest level measured in the survey instrument. The maximum income level able to be reported creates a "ceiling" that results in measurement inaccuracy, as the dependent variable range is not inclusive of the true values above that point. The ceiling effect can occur any time a measure involves a set range in which a normal distribution predicts multiple scores at or above the maximum value for the dependent variable.

== Data-gathering ==
A ceiling effect in data-gathering, when variance in a dependent variable is not measured or estimated above a certain level, is a commonly encountered practical issue in gathering data in multiple scientific disciplines. Such an effect is often the result of constraints on data-gathering instruments. When a ceiling effect occurs in data-gathering, there is a bunching of scores at the upper level reported by an instrument.

=== Response bias constraints ===
Response bias occurs commonly in research regarding issues that may have ethical bases or are generally perceived as having negative connotations. Participants may fail to respond to a measure appropriately based on whether they believe the accurate response is viewed negatively. A population survey about lifestyle variables influencing health outcomes might include a question about smoking habits. To guard against the possibility that a respondent who is a heavy smoker might decline to give an accurate response about smoking, the highest level of smoking asked about in the survey instrument might be "two packs a day or more". This results in a ceiling effect in that persons who smoke three packs or more a day are not distinguished from persons who smoke exactly two packs. A population survey about income similarly might have a highest response level of "$100,000 per year or more", rather than including higher income ranges, as respondents might decline to answer at all if the survey questions identify their income too specifically. This too results in a ceiling effect, not distinguishing persons who have an income of $500,000 per year or higher from those whose income is exactly $100,000 per year. The role of response bias in causing ceiling effects is clearly seen through the example of survey respondents believing the desirable response to be the maximum reportable value, resulting in a clustering of data points. The attempted prevention of response bias, in the case of the smoking habit survey, leads to ceiling effects through the basic design of the measure.

=== Range-of-instrument constraints ===
The range of data that can be gathered by a particular instrument may be constrained by inherent limits in the instrument's design. Often design of a particular instrument involves trade-offs between ceiling effects and floor effects. If a dependent variable measured on a nominal scale does not have response categories that appropriately cover the upper end of the sample's distribution, the maximum value response will have to include all values above the end of the scale. This will result in a ceiling effect due to the grouping of respondents into the single maximum category, which prevents an accurate representation of the deviation beyond that point. This issue occurs in multiple types of surveys that use pre-determined bracket-style responses. When multiple subjects have scores on a variable at the upper limit of what an instrument reports, data analysis provides inaccurate information because some actual variation in the data is not reflected in the scores obtained from that instrument.

A ceiling effect is said to occur when a high proportion of subjects in a study have maximum scores on the observed variable. This makes discrimination among subjects among the top end of the scale impossible. For example, an examination paper may lead to, say, 50% of the students scoring 100%. While such a paper may serve as a useful threshold test, it does not allow ranking of the top performers. For this reason, examination of test results for a possible ceiling effect, and the converse floor effect, is often built into the validation of instruments such as those used for measuring quality of life.

In such a case, the ceiling effect keeps the instrument from noting a measurement or estimate higher than some limit not related to the phenomenon being observed, but rather related to the design of the instrument. A crude example would be measuring the heights of trees with a ruler only 20 meters in length, if it is apparent on the basis of other evidence that there are trees much taller than 20 meters. Using the 20-meter ruler as the sole means of measuring trees would impose a ceiling on gathering data about tree height. Ceiling effects and floor effects both limit the range of data reported by the instrument, reducing variability in the gathered data. Limited variability in the data gathered on one variable may reduce the power of statistics on correlations between that variable and another variable.

==== College admission tests ====
In the various countries that use admission tests as the main element or an important element for determining eligibility for college or university study, the data gathered relates to the differing levels of performance of applicants on the tests. When a college admission test has a maximum possible score that can be attained without perfect performance on the test's item content, the test's scoring scale has a ceiling effect. Moreover, if the test's item content is easy for many test-takers, the test may not reflect actual differences in performance (as would be detected with other instruments) among test-takers at the high end of the test performance range. Mathematics tests used for college admission in the United States and similar tests used for university admission in Britain illustrate both phenomena.

==== Cognitive psychology ====
In cognitive psychology, mental processes such as problem solving and memorization are studied experimentally by using operational definitions that allow for clear measurements. A common measurement of interest is the time taken to respond to a given stimulus. In studying this variable, a ceiling may be the lowest possible number (the fewest milliseconds to a response), rather than the highest value, as is the usual interpretation of "ceiling". In response time studies, it may appear that a ceiling had occurred in the measurements due to an apparent clustering around some minimum amount of time (such as the fastest time recorded in an experiment). However, this clustering could actually represent a natural physiological limit of response time, rather than an artifact of the stopwatch sensitivity (which of course would be a ceiling effect). Further statistical study, and scientific judgment, can resolve whether or not the observations are due to a ceiling or are the truth of the matter.

=== Validity of instrument constraints ===
==== IQ testing ====
Some authors on gifted education write about ceiling effects in IQ testing having negative consequences on individuals. Those authors sometimes claim such ceilings produce systematic underestimation of the IQs of intellectually gifted people. In this case, it is necessary to distinguish carefully two different ways the term "ceiling" is used in writings about IQ testing.

IQ scores can differ to some degree for the same individual on different IQ tests (age 12–13 years). (IQ score table data and pupil pseudonyms adapted from description of KABC-II norming study cited in Kaufman 2009.)
Pupil	KABC-II	WISC-III	WJ-III
Asher	90	95	111
Brianna	125	110	105
Colin	100	93	101
Danica	116	127	118
Elpha	93	105	93
Fritz	106	105	105
Georgi	95	100	90
Hector	112	113	103
Imelda	104	96	97
Jose	101	99	86
Keoku	81	78	75
Leo	116	124	102

The ceilings of IQ subtests are imposed by their ranges of progressively more difficult items. An IQ test with a wide range of progressively more difficult questions will have a higher ceiling than one with a narrow range and few difficult items. Ceiling effects result in an inability, first, to distinguish among the gifted (whether moderately gifted, profoundly gifted, etc.), and second, results in the erroneous classification of some gifted people as above average, but not gifted.

Suppose that an IQ test has three subtests: vocabulary, arithmetic, and picture analogies. The scores on each of the subtests are normalized (see standard score) and then added together to produce a composite IQ score. Now suppose that Joe obtains the maximum score of 20 on the arithmetic test, but gets 10 out of 20 on the vocabulary and analogies tests. Is it fair to say that Joe's total score of 20+10+10, or 40, represents his total ability? The answer is no, because Joe achieved the maximum possible score of 20 on the arithmetic test. Had the arithmetic test included additional, more difficult items, Joe might have gotten 30 points on that subtest, producing a "true" score of 30+10+10 or 50. Compare Joe's performance with that of Jim, who scored 15+15+15 = 45, without running into any subtest ceilings. In the original formulation of the test, Jim did better than Joe (45 versus 40), whereas it is Joe who actually should have gotten the higher "total" intelligence score than Jim (score of 50 for Joe versus 45 for Jim) using a reformulated test that includes more difficult arithmetic items.

Writings on gifted education bring up two reasons for supposing that some IQ scores are underestimates of a test-taker's intelligence:

1. they tend to perform all subtests better than less talented people;
2. they tend to do much better on some subtests than others, raising the inter-subtest variability and chance that a ceiling will be encountered.

=== Statistical analysis ===
Ceiling effects on measurement compromise scientific truth and understanding through a number of related statistical aberrations.

First, ceilings impair the ability of investigators to determine the central tendency of the data. When a ceiling effect relates to data gathered on a dependent variable, failure to recognize that ceiling effect may "lead to the mistaken conclusion that the independent variable has no effect." For mathematical reasons beyond the scope of this article (see analysis of variance), this inhibited variance reduces the sensitivity of scientific experiments designed to determine if the average of one group is significantly different from the average of another group. For example, a treatment given to one group may produce an effect, but the effect may escape detection because the mean of the treated group won't look different enough from the mean of the untreated group.

Thus "ceiling effects are a complex of matters and their avoidance a matter of careful evaluation of a range of issues."

=== Prevention ===
Because ceiling effects prevent accurate interpretation of data, it is important to attempt preventing the effects from occurring or using the presence of the effects to adjust the instrument and procedures that were used. Researchers may try to prevent ceiling effects from occurring using a number of methods. The first of which is choosing a previously validated measure by reviewing past research. If no validated measures exist, pilot testing may be conducted using the proposed methods. Pilot testing, or conducting a pilot experiment, involves a small-scale trial of instruments and procedures prior to the actual experiment, allowing for the recognition that adjustments should be made for the most efficient and accurate data collection. If researchers are using a design that is not previously validated, a combination of surveys, involving that originally-proposed and another supported by past literature, may be used to assess for the presence of ceiling effects. If any research, especially the pilot study, shows a ceiling effect, efforts should be made to adjust the instrument so that the effect may be mitigated and informative research can be conducted.

== See also ==
- Floor effect

== Bibliography ==
- Cramer, Duncan; Howitt, Dennis Laurence (2005). The SAGE Dictionary of Statistics: A Practical Resource for Students in the Social Sciences (Third ed.). SAGE. p. 21 (entry "ceiling effect"). ISBN 978-0-7619-4138-5.
- Kaufman, Alan S. (2009). IQ Testing 101. New York: Springer Publishing. pp. 151–153. ISBN 978-0-8261-0629-2.
- Po, Alain Li Wan (1998). Dictionary of Evidence-based Medicine. Radcliffe Publishing. p. 20. ISBN 978-1-85775-305-9.
- Vogt, W. Paul (2005). Dictionary of Statistics & Methodology: A Nontechnical Guide for the Social Sciences (Third ed.). SAGE. p. 40 (entry "ceiling effect"). ISBN 978-0-7619-8855-7.
