= Galactose 1-dehydrogenase =

Galactose 1-dehydrogenase may refer to:

- ʟ-Galactose 1-dehydrogenase
- ᴅ-Galactose 1-dehydrogenase
- Galactose 1-dehydrogenase (NADP^{+})
