= Vitamin C =

Essential nutrient found in citrus fruits and other foods

Ascorbic acid

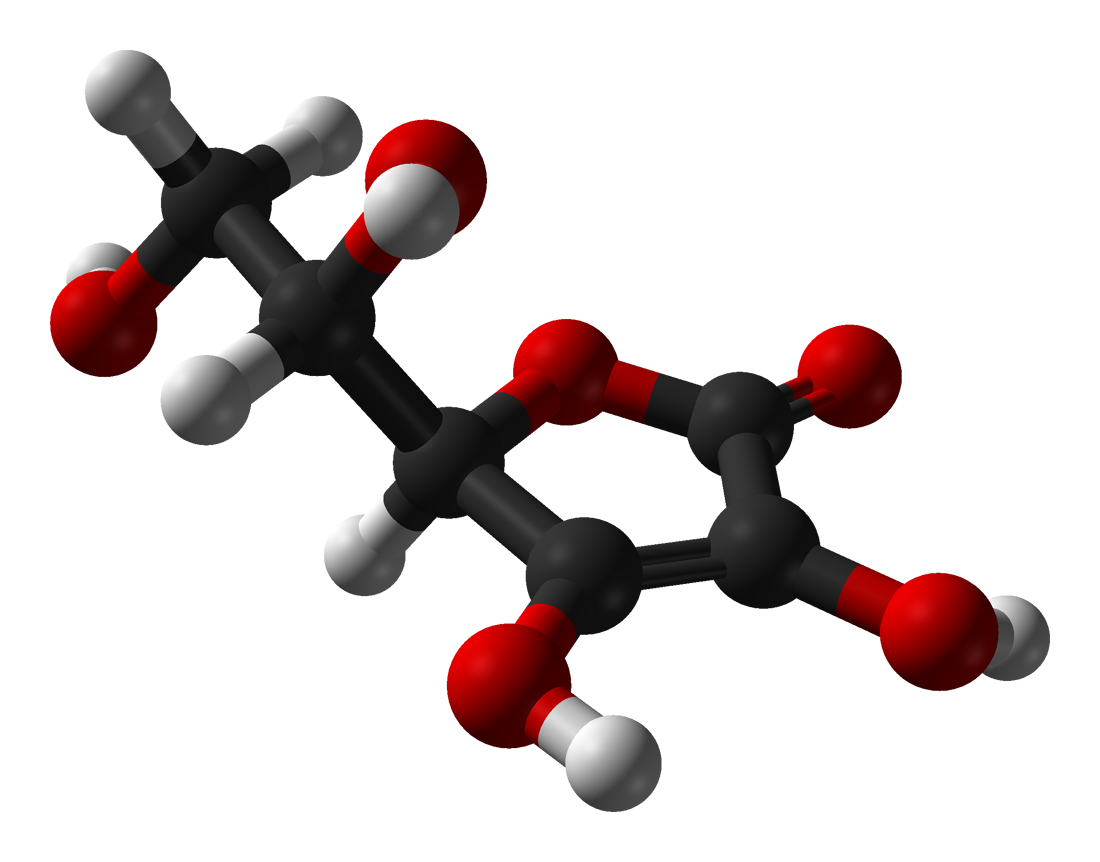

Clinical data
- Pronunciation: /əˈskɔːrbɪk/, /əˈskɔːrbeɪt, -bɪt/
- Trade names: Ascor, Cecon, Cevalin, others
- Other names: l-ascorbic acid, ascorbic acid, ascorbate
- AHFS/Drugs.com: Monograph
- MedlinePlus: a682583
- License data: US DailyMed: Ascorbic acid
- Routes of administration: By mouth, intramuscular, intravenous, subcutaneous
- ATC code: A11GA01 (WHO) A11GB01 (WHO) G01AD03 (WHO) S01XA15 (WHO)

Legal status
- Legal status: AU: Unscheduled; UK: POM (Prescription only) / GSL; US: ℞-only / OTC/ Dietary Supplement

Pharmacokinetic data
- Bioavailability: Rapid, diminishes as dose increases
- Protein binding: Negligible
- Elimination half-life: Varies according to plasma concentration
- Excretion: Kidney

Identifiers
- IUPAC name: l-threo-Hex-2-enono-1,4-lactone or (R)-3,4-Dihydroxy-5-((S)- 1,2-dihydroxyethyl)furan-2(5H)-one
- CAS Number: 50-81-7; as salt: 134-03-2
- PubChem CID: 54670067; as salt: 23667548
- IUPHAR/BPS: 4781
- DrugBank: DB00126; as salt: DB14482
- ChemSpider: 10189562; as salt: 16736174
- UNII: PQ6CK8PD0R; as salt: S033EH8359
- KEGG: D00018; as salt: D05853
- ChEBI: CHEBI:29073; as salt: CHEBI:113451
- ChEMBL: ChEMBL196; as salt: ChEMBL591665
- NIAID ChemDB: 002072
- PDB ligand: ASC (PDBe, RCSB PDB)
- E number: E300 (antioxidants, ...)
- CompTox Dashboard (EPA): DTXSID5020106
- ECHA InfoCard: 100.000.061

Chemical and physical data
- Formula: C_{6}H_{8}O_{6}
- Molar mass: 176.124 g·mol^{−1}
- 3D model (JSmol): Interactive image
- Density: 1.694 g/cm^{3}
- Melting point: 190 to 192 °C (374 to 378 °F)
- Boiling point: 552.7 °C (1,026.9 °F)
- SMILES: OC[C@H](O)[C@H]1OC(=O)C(O)=C1O
- InChI: InChI=1S/C6H8O6/c7-1-2(8)5-3(9)4(10)6(11)12-5/h2,5,7-10H,1H2/t2-,5+/m0/s1; Key:CIWBSHSKHKDKBQ-JLAZNSOCSA-N

Vitamin C or ascorbate is a water-soluble vitamin found in citrus and other fruits and vegetables. It is found as a form of ascorbic acid. It is an essential nutrient involved in the repair of tissue, the formation of collagen, and the enzymatic production of certain neurotransmitters. It is required for the functioning of several enzymes and is important for immune system function. It is also an antioxidant. Most animals are able to synthesize their own vitamin C. However, higher primates (including humans), most bats, guinea pigs, some fish species, and some bird species must acquire it from dietary sources because a gene for a synthesis enzyme has mutations that render it dysfunctional; humans obtain this vitamin from those fruits and vegetables.

It is also a generic prescription medication and in some countries is sold as a non-prescription dietary supplement. As a therapy, it is used to prevent and treat scurvy, a disease caused by vitamin C deficiency. Vitamin C may be taken by mouth or by intramuscular, subcutaneous or intravenous injection. Various health claims exist on the supposition that moderate vitamin C deficiency increases disease risk, such as for the common cold, cancer or COVID-19. There are also claims of benefits from vitamin C supplementation in excess of the recommended dietary intake for people who are not considered vitamin C deficient. Vitamin C is generally well tolerated. Large doses may cause gastrointestinal discomfort, headache, trouble sleeping, and flushing of the skin. The United States National Academy of Medicine recommends against consuming large amounts.

Vitamin C was discovered in 1912, isolated in 1928, and in 1933, was the first vitamin to be chemically produced. Partly for its discovery, Albert Szent-Györgyi was awarded the 1937 Nobel Prize in Physiology or Medicine.

== Chemistry ==
ascorbic acid
(reduced form)

dehydroascorbic acid
(oxidized form)

The name "vitamin C" always refers to the l-enantiomers of ascorbic acid and its oxidized form, dehydroascorbate (DHA). Therefore, unless written otherwise, "ascorbate" and "ascorbic acid" refer in the nutritional literature to l-ascorbate and l-ascorbic acid respectively. Ascorbic acid is a weak sugar acid structurally related to glucose. In biological systems, ascorbic acid can be found only at low pH, but in solutions above pH 5 it is predominantly found in the ionized form, ascorbate.

Many analytical methods have been developed for ascorbic acid detection. For example, vitamin C content of a food sample such as fruit juice can be calculated by measuring the volume of the sample required to decolorize a solution of dichlorophenolindophenol (DCPIP) and then calibrating the results by comparison with a known concentration of vitamin C.

== Deficiency ==
Plasma vitamin C is the most widely applied test for vitamin C status. Adequate levels are defined as near 50 μmol/L. Hypovitaminosis of vitamin C is defined as less than 23 μmol/L, and deficiency as less than 11.4 μmol/L. For people 20 years of age or above, data from the US 2017–18 National Health and Nutrition Examination Survey showed mean serum concentrations of 53.4 μmol/L. Deficiency was reported in 5.9% of people. Globally, vitamin C deficiency is common in low and middle-income countries, and not uncommon in high income countries. In the latter, prevalence is higher in males than in females.

Plasma levels are considered saturated at about 65 μmol/L, achieved by intakes of 100 to 200 mg/day, which are well above the recommended intakes. Even higher oral intake does not further raise plasma nor tissue concentrations because absorption efficiency decreases and any excess that is absorbed is excreted in urine.

=== Diagnostic testing ===
Vitamin C content in plasma is used to determine vitamin status. For research purposes, concentrations can be assessed in leukocytes and tissues, which are normally maintained at an order of magnitude higher than in plasma via an energy-dependent transport system, depleted slower than plasma concentrations during dietary deficiency and restored faster during dietary repletion, but these analyses are difficult to measure, and hence not part of standard diagnostic testing.

== Diet ==
=== Recommended consumption ===
Recommendations for vitamin C intake by adults have been set by various national agencies:

- 40 mg/day: India National Institute of Nutrition, Hyderabad
- 45 mg/day or 300 mg/week: the World Health Organization
- 80 mg/day: the European Commission Council on nutrition labeling
- 90 mg/day (males) and 75 mg/day (females): Health Canada 2007
- 90 mg/day (males) and 75 mg/day (females): United States National Academy of Sciences
- 100 mg/day: Japan National Institute of Health and Nutrition
- 110 mg/day (males) and 95 mg/day (females): European Food Safety Authority

US vitamin C recommendations (mg per day)
RDA (children ages 1–3 years)	15
RDA (children ages 4–8 years)	25
RDA (children ages 9–13 years)	45
RDA (girls ages 14–18 years)	65
RDA (boys ages 14–18 years)	75
RDA (adult female)	75
RDA (adult male)	90
RDA (pregnancy)	85
RDA (lactation)	120
UL (adult female)	2,000
UL (adult male)	2,000

In 2000, the chapter on Vitamin C in the North American Dietary Reference Intake was updated to give the Recommended Dietary Allowance (RDA) as 90 milligrams per day for adult men, 75 mg/day for adult women, and setting a tolerable upper intake level (UL) for adults of 2,000 mg/day. The table here shows RDAs for the United States and Canada for children, and for pregnant and lactating women, as well as the ULs for adults.

For the European Union, the EFSA set higher recommendations for adults, and also for children: 20 mg/day for ages 1–3, 30 mg/day for ages 4–6, 45 mg/day for ages 7–10, 70 mg/day for ages 11–14, 100 mg/day for males ages 15–17, 90 mg/day for females ages 15–17. For pregnancy 100 mg/day; for lactation 155 mg/day.

Cigarette smokers and people exposed to secondhand smoke have lower serum vitamin C levels than nonsmokers. The reasoning is that inhalation of smoke causes oxidative damage, depleting this antioxidant vitamin. The US Institute of Medicine estimated that smokers need 35 mg more vitamin C per day than nonsmokers, but did not formally establish a higher RDA for smokers.

The US National Center for Health Statistics conducts biannual National Health and Nutrition Examination Survey (NHANES) to assess the health and nutritional status of adults and children in the United States. Some results are reported as What We Eat In America. The 2013–2014 survey reported that for adults ages 20 years and older, men consumed on average 83.3 mg/d and women 75.1 mg/d. This means that half the women and more than half the men are not consuming the RDA for vitamin C. The same survey stated that about 30% of adults reported they consumed a vitamin C dietary supplement or a multi-vitamin/mineral supplement that included vitamin C, and that for these people total consumption was between 300 and 400 mg/d.

==== Tolerable upper intake level ====
In 2000, the Institute of Medicine of the US National Academy of Sciences set a tolerable upper intake level (UL) for adults of 2,000 mg/day. The amount was chosen because human trials had reported diarrhea and other gastrointestinal disturbances at intakes of greater than 3,000 mg/day. This was the Lowest-Observed-Adverse-Effect Level (LOAEL), meaning that other adverse effects were observed at even higher intakes. ULs are progressively lower for younger and younger children. In 2006, the European Food Safety Authority (EFSA) also pointed out the disturbances at that dose level, but reached the conclusion that there was not sufficient evidence to set a UL for vitamin C, as did the Japan National Institute of Health and Nutrition in 2010.

=== Food labeling ===
For US food and dietary supplement labeling purposes, the amount in a serving is expressed as a percent of Daily Value (%DV). For vitamin C labeling purposes, 100% of the Daily Value was 60 mg, but as of May 27, 2016, it was revised to 90 mg to bring it into agreement with the RDA. A table of the old and new adult daily values is provided at Reference Daily Intake.

European Union regulations require that labels declare energy, protein, fat, saturated fat, carbohydrates, sugars, and salt. Voluntary nutrients may be shown if present in significant amounts. Instead of Daily Values, amounts are shown as percent of Reference Intakes (RIs). For vitamin C, 100% RI was set at 80 mg in 2011.

== Sources ==
Although also present in other plant-derived foods, the richest natural sources of vitamin C are fruits and vegetables. Vitamin C is the most widely taken dietary supplement.

=== Plant sources ===
The following table is approximate and shows the relative abundance in different raw plant sources. The amount is given in milligrams per 100 grams of the edible portion of the fruit or vegetable:

Raw plant source	Amount (mg / 100g)
Kakadu plum	1000–5300
Camu camu	2800
Acerola	1677
Indian gooseberry	445
Rose hip	426
Common sea-buckthorn	400
Guava	228
Blackcurrant	200
Yellow bell pepper/capsicum	183
Red bell pepper/capsicum	128
Kale	120
Broccoli	90
Kiwifruit	90

Raw plant source	Amount (mg / 100g)
Green bell pepper/capsicum	80
Brussels sprouts	80
Loganberry, redcurrant	80
Cloudberry, elderberry	60
Strawberry	60
Papaya	60
Orange, lemon	53
Cauliflower	48
Pineapple	48
Cantaloupe	40
Passion fruit, raspberry	30
Grapefruit, lime	30
Cabbage, spinach	30

Raw plant source	Amount (mg / 100g)
Mango	28
Blackberry, cassava	21
Potato	20
Honeydew melon	20
Tomato	14
Cranberry	13
Blueberry, grape	10
Apricot, plum, watermelon	10
Avocado	8.8
Onion	7.4
Cherry, peach	7
Apple	6
Carrot, asparagus	6

=== Animal sources ===
Animal-sourced foods do not generally provide much vitamin C, and what there is, is largely destroyed by heat during cooking. For example, raw chicken liver contains 17.9 mg/100 g, but fried, the content is reduced to 2.7 mg/100 g. Vitamin C is present in human breast milk at 5.0 mg/100 g. Cow's milk contains 1.0 mg/100 g, but the heat of pasteurization destroys it.

=== Food preparation ===
Vitamin C chemically decomposes under certain conditions, many of which may occur during the cooking of food. Vitamin C concentrations in various food substances decrease with time in proportion to the temperature at which they are stored. Cooking can reduce the vitamin C content of vegetables by around 60%, possibly due to increased enzymatic destruction. Longer cooking times may add to this effect. Another cause of vitamin C loss from food is leaching, which transfers vitamin C to the cooking water, which is decanted and not consumed.

=== Supplements ===
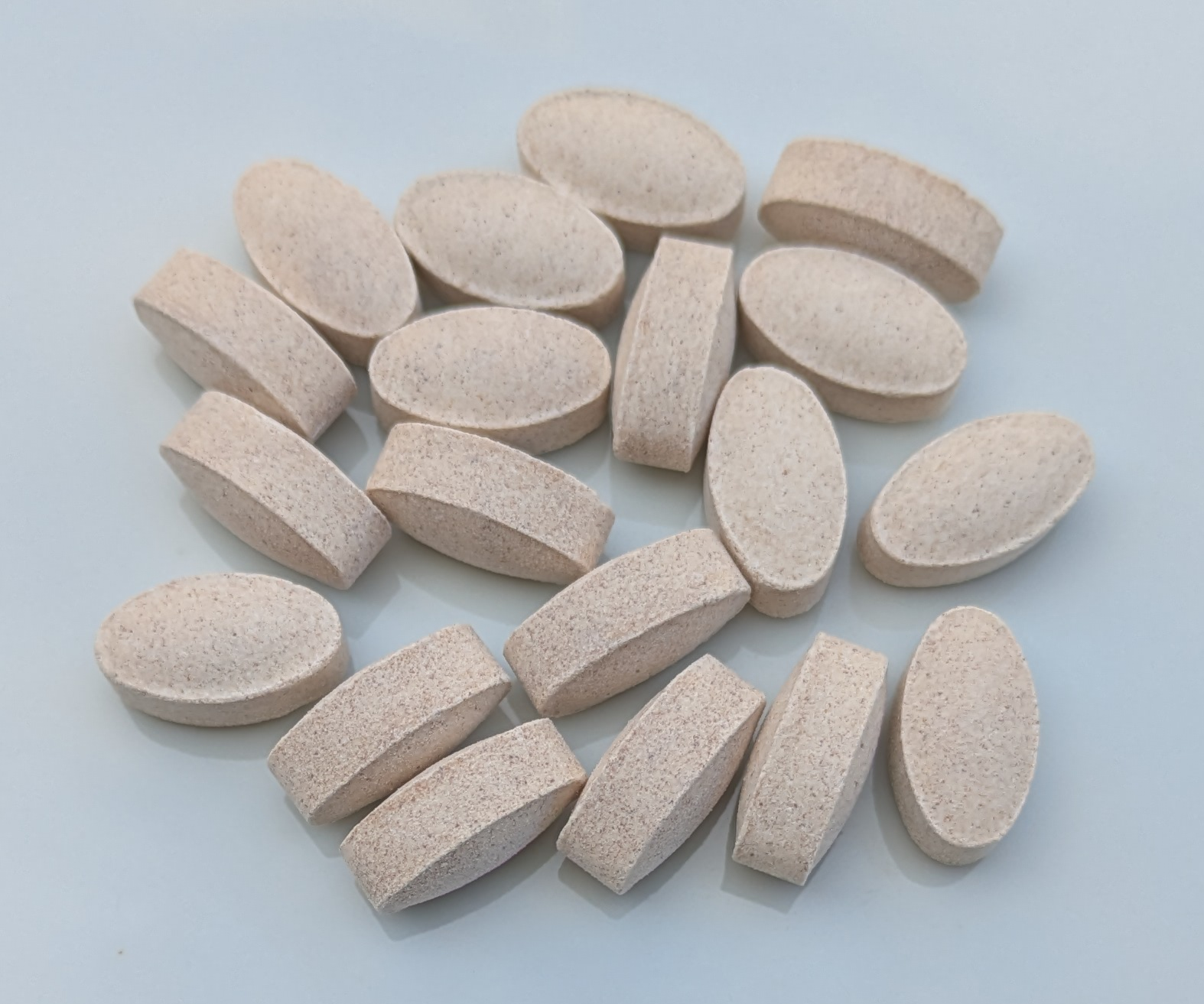
Vitamin C supplements

Vitamin C dietary supplements are available as tablets, capsules, drink mix packets, in multi-vitamin/mineral formulations, in antioxidant formulations, and as crystalline powder. Vitamin C is also added to some fruit juices and juice drinks. Tablet and capsule content ranges from 25 mg to 1500 mg per serving. The most commonly used supplement compounds are ascorbic acid, sodium ascorbate and calcium ascorbate. Vitamin C molecules can also be bound to the fatty acid palmitate, creating ascorbyl palmitate, or else incorporated into liposomes.

=== Food fortification ===
Countries fortify foods with nutrients to address known deficiencies. While many countries mandate or have voluntary programs to fortify wheat flour, maize (corn) flour or rice with vitamins, none include vitamin C in those programs. As described in Vitamin C Fortification of Food Aid Commodities (1997), the United States provides rations to international food relief programs, later under the auspices of the Food for Peace Act and the Bureau for Humanitarian Assistance. Vitamin C is added to corn-soy blend and wheat-soy blend products at 40 mg/100 grams. (along with minerals and other vitamins). Supplemental rations of these highly fortified, blended foods are provided to refugees and displaced persons in camps and to beneficiaries of development feeding programs that are targeted largely toward mothers and children. The report adds: "The stability of vitamin C (L-ascorbic acid) is of concern because this is one of the most labile vitamins in foods. Its main loss during processing and storage is from oxidation, which is accelerated by light, oxygen, heat, increased pH, high moisture content (water activity), and the presence of copper or ferrous salts. To reduce oxidation, the vitamin C used in commodity fortification is coated with ethyl cellulose (2.5 percent). Oxidative losses also occur during food processing and preparation, and additional vitamin C may be lost if it dissolves into cooking liquid and is then discarded."

== Food preservation additive ==
Ascorbic acid and some of its salts and esters are common additives added to foods such as canned fruits, mostly to slow oxidation and enzymatic browning. It may be used as a flour treatment agent used in breadmaking. As food additives, they are assigned E numbers, with safety assessment and approval the responsibility of the European Food Safety Authority. The relevant E numbers are:

1. E300 ascorbic acid (approved for use as a food additive in the UK, US Canada, Australia and New Zealand)
2. E301 sodium ascorbate (approved for use as a food additive in the UK, US, Canada, Australia and New Zealand)
3. E302 calcium ascorbate (approved for use as a food additive in the UK, US Canada, Australia and New Zealand)
4. E303 potassium ascorbate (approved in Australia and New Zealand, but not in the UK, US or Canada)
5. E304 fatty acid esters of ascorbic acid such as ascorbyl palmitate (approved for use as a food additive in the UK, US, Canada, Australia and New Zealand)

The stereoisomers of Vitamin C have a similar effect in food despite their lack of efficacy in human scurvy. They include erythorbic acid and its sodium salt (E315, E316).

== Pharmacology ==
=== Pharmacodynamics ===
Pharmacodynamics includes enzymes for which vitamin C is a cofactor, with function potentially compromised in a deficiency state, and any enzyme cofactor or other physiological function affected by administration of vitamin C, orally or injected, in excess of normal requirements. At normal physiological concentrations, vitamin C is an enzyme substrate or cofactor and an electron donor antioxidant. The enzymatic functions include the synthesis of collagen, carnitine, and neurotransmitters; the synthesis and catabolism of tyrosine; and the metabolism of microsomes. In nonenzymatic functions it acts as a reducing agent, donating electrons to oxidized molecules and preventing oxidation in order to keep iron and copper atoms in their reduced states. At non-physiological concentrations achieved by intravenous dosing, vitamin C can be a pro-oxidant, with therapeutic toxicity against cancer cells.

Vitamin C is a cofactor for the following enzymes:

- Three groups of enzymes (prolyl-3-hydroxylases, prolyl-4-hydroxylases, and lysyl hydroxylases) that are required for the hydroxylation of proline and lysine in the synthesis of collagen. These reactions add hydroxyl groups to the amino acids proline or lysine in the collagen molecule via prolyl hydroxylase and lysyl hydroxylase, both requiring vitamin C as a cofactor. The role of vitamin C as a cofactor is to oxidize prolyl hydroxylase and lysyl hydroxylase from Fe^{2+} to Fe^{3+} and to reduce it from Fe^{3+} to Fe^{2+}. Hydroxylation allows the collagen molecule to assume its triple helix structure, and thus vitamin C is essential to the development and maintenance of scar tissue, blood vessels, and cartilage.
- Two enzymes (ε-N-trimethyl-L-lysine hydroxylase and γ-butyrobetaine hydroxylase) are necessary for synthesis of carnitine. Carnitine is essential for the transport of fatty acids into mitochondria for ATP generation.
- Hypoxia-inducible factor-proline dioxygenase enzymes (isoforms: EGLN1, EGLN2, and EGLN3) allows cells to respond physiologically to low concentrations of oxygen.
- Dopamine beta-hydroxylase participates in the biosynthesis of norepinephrine from dopamine.
- Peptidylglycine alpha-amidating monooxygenase amidates peptide hormones by removing the glyoxylate residue from their c-terminal glycine residues. This increases peptide hormone stability and activity.

As an antioxidant, ascorbate scavenges reactive oxygen and nitrogen compounds, thus neutralizing the potential tissue damage of these free radical compounds. Dehydroascorbate, the oxidized form, is then recycled back to ascorbate by endogenous antioxidants such as glutathione. In the eye, ascorbate is thought to protect against photolytically generated free-radical damage; higher plasma ascorbate is associated with lower risk of cataracts. Ascorbate may also provide antioxidant protection indirectly by regenerating other biological antioxidants such as α-tocopherol back to an active state. In addition, ascorbate is also a non-enzymatic reducing agent for mixed-function oxidases in the microsomal drug-metabolizing system that inactivates a wide variety of substrates such as drugs and environmental carcinogens.

=== Pharmacokinetics ===
Ascorbic acid is absorbed in the body by both active transport and passive diffusion. Approximately 70%–90% of vitamin C is active-transport absorbed when intakes of 30–180 mg/day from a combination of food sources and moderate-dose dietary supplements such as a multi-vitamin/mineral product are consumed. However, when large amounts are consumed, such as a vitamin C dietary supplement, the active transport system becomes saturated, and while the total amount being absorbed continues to increase with dose, absorption efficiency falls to less than 50%. Active transport is managed by Sodium-Ascorbate Co-Transporter proteins (SVCTs) and Hexose Transporter proteins (GLUTs). SVCT1 and SVCT2 import ascorbate across plasma membranes. The Hexose Transporter proteins GLUT1, GLUT3 and GLUT4 transfer only the oxydized dehydroascorbic acid (DHA) form of vitamin C. The amount of DHA found in plasma and tissues under normal conditions is low, as cells rapidly reduce DHA to ascorbate.

SVCTs are the predominant system for vitamin C transport within the body. In both vitamin C synthesizers (example: rat) and non-synthesizers (example: human) cells maintain ascorbic acid concentrations much higher than the approximately 50 micromoles/liter (μmol/L) found in plasma. For example, the ascorbic acid content of pituitary and adrenal glands can exceed 2,000 μmol/L, and muscle is at 200–300 μmol/L. The known coenzymatic functions of ascorbic acid do not require such high concentrations, so there may be other, as yet unknown functions. A consequence of all this high concentration organ content is that plasma vitamin C is not a good indicator of whole-body status, and people may vary in the time needed to show symptoms of deficiency when consuming a diet low in vitamin C.

Excretion (via urine) is as ascorbic acid and metabolites. The fraction that is excreted as unmetabolized ascorbic acid increases as intake increases. In addition, ascorbic acid converts (reversibly) to DHA and from that compound non-reversibly to 2,3-diketogulonate and then oxalate. These three metabolites are also excreted via urine. During times of low dietary intake, vitamin C is reabsorbed by the kidneys rather than excreted. This salvage process delays onset of deficiency. Humans are better than guinea pigs at converting DHA back to ascorbate, and thus take much longer to become vitamin C deficient.

== Synthesis ==
Most animals and plants are able to synthesize vitamin C through a sequence of enzyme-driven steps, which convert monosaccharides to vitamin C. Yeasts do not make l-ascorbic acid but rather its stereoisomer, erythorbic acid. In plants, synthesis is accomplished through the conversion of mannose or galactose to ascorbic acid. In animals, the starting material is glucose. In some species that synthesize ascorbate in the liver (including mammals and perching birds), the glucose is extracted from glycogen; ascorbate synthesis is a glycogenolysis-dependent process. In humans and in animals that cannot synthesize vitamin C, the enzyme l-gulonolactone oxidase (GULO), which catalyzes the last step in the biosynthesis, is highly mutated and non-functional.

=== Animal synthesis ===
There is some information on serum vitamin C concentrations maintained in animal species that are able to synthesize vitamin C. One study of several breeds of dogs reported an average of 35.9 μmol/L. A report on goats, sheep and cattle reported ranges of 100–110, 265–270 and 160–350 μmol/L, respectively.

The biosynthesis of ascorbic acid in vertebrates starts with the formation of UDP-glucuronic acid. UDP-glucuronic acid is formed when UDP-glucose undergoes two oxidations catalyzed by the enzyme UDP-glucose 6-dehydrogenase. UDP-glucose 6-dehydrogenase uses the co-factor NAD^{+} as the electron acceptor. The transferase UDP-glucuronate pyrophosphorylase removes a UMP and glucuronokinase, with the cofactor ADP, removes the final phosphate leading to d-glucuronic acid. The aldehyde group of this compound is reduced to a primary alcohol using the enzyme glucuronate reductase and the cofactor NADPH, yielding l-gulonic acid. This is followed by lactone formation—utilizing the hydrolase gluconolactonase—between the carbonyl on C1 and hydroxyl group on C4. l-Gulonolactone then reacts with oxygen, catalyzed by the enzyme L-gulonolactone oxidase (which is nonfunctional in humans and other Haplorrhini primates; see Unitary pseudogenes) and the cofactor FAD+. This reaction produces 2-oxogulonolactone (2-keto-gulonolactone), which spontaneously undergoes enolization to form ascorbic acid. Reptiles and older orders of birds make ascorbic acid in their kidneys. Recent orders of birds and most mammals make ascorbic acid in their liver.

==== Non-synthesizers ====
Some mammals have lost the ability to synthesize vitamin C, including simians and tarsiers, which together make up one of two major primate suborders, Haplorhini. This group includes humans. The other more primitive primates (Strepsirrhini) have the ability to make vitamin C. Synthesis does not occur in some species in the rodent family Caviidae, which includes guinea pigs and capybaras, but does occur in other rodents, including rats and mice.

Synthesis does not occur in most bat species, but there are at least two species, frugivorous bat Rousettus leschenaultii and insectivorous bat Hipposideros armiger, that retain (or regained) their ability of vitamin C production. A number of species of passerine birds also do not synthesize, but not all of them, and those that do not are not clearly related; it has been proposed that the ability was lost separately a number of times in birds. In particular, the ability to synthesize vitamin C is presumed to have been lost and then later re-acquired in at least two cases. The ability to synthesize vitamin C has also been lost in about 96% of extant fish (the teleosts). Schistosomes (parasitic flatworms) cannot synthesize vitamin C and require it from their hosts in order to produce eggs; in both guinea pigs and in mice genetically engineered to be non-synthesizers, vitamin C deficiency prevents schistosomes from reproducing. In mice, it has additionally been found that vitamin C deficiency (even intermittent) prevents schistosomes from causing disease.

On a milligram consumed per kilogram of body weight basis, simian non-synthesizer species consume the vitamin in amounts 10 to 20 times higher than what is recommended by governments for humans. This discrepancy constituted some of the basis of the controversy on human recommended dietary allowances being set too low. However, simian consumption does not indicate simian requirements. Merck's veterinary manual states that daily intake of vitamin C at 3–6 mg/kg prevents scurvy in non-human primates. By way of comparison, across several countries, the recommended dietary intake for adult humans is in the range of 1–2 mg/kg.

==== Evolution of animal synthesis ====
Ascorbic acid is a common enzymatic cofactor in mammals used in the synthesis of collagen, as well as a powerful reducing agent capable of rapidly scavenging a number of reactive oxygen species (ROS). Given that ascorbate has these important functions, it is surprising that the ability to synthesize this molecule has not always been conserved. In fact, anthropoid primates, Cavia porcellus (guinea pigs), teleost fishes, most bats, and some passerine birds have all independently lost the ability to internally synthesize vitamin C in either the kidney or the liver. In all of the cases where genomic analysis was done on an ascorbic acid auxotroph, the origin of the change was found to be a result of loss-of-function mutations in the gene that encodes L-gulono-γ-lactone oxidase, the enzyme that catalyzes the last step of the ascorbic acid pathway outlined above. One explanation for the repeated loss of the ability to synthesize vitamin C is that it was the result of genetic drift; assuming that the diet was rich in vitamin C, natural selection would not act to preserve it.

In the case of the simians, the loss of the ability to make vitamin C may have occurred much farther back in evolutionary history than the emergence of humans or even apes, since it evidently occurred soon after the appearance of the first primates, yet sometime after the split of early primates into the two major suborders Haplorrhini (which cannot make vitamin C) and its sister suborder of non-tarsier prosimians, the Strepsirrhini ("wet-nosed" primates), which retained the ability to make vitamin C. According to molecular clock dating, these two suborder primate branches parted ways about 63 to 60 million years ago. Approximately three to five million years later (58 million years ago), only a short time afterward from an evolutionary perspective, the infraorder Tarsiiformes, whose only remaining family is that of the tarsier (Tarsiidae), branched off from the other haplorrhines. Since tarsiers also cannot make vitamin C, this implies the mutation had already occurred, placing it between these two marker points (63 to 58 million years ago).

It has also been noted that the loss of the ability to synthesize ascorbate strikingly parallels the inability to break down uric acid, also a characteristic of primates. Uric acid and ascorbate are both strong reducing agents. This has led to the suggestion that, in higher primates, uric acid has taken over some of the functions of ascorbate.

=== Plant synthesis ===
Vitamin C biosynthesis in plants

There are many different biosynthesis pathways to ascorbic acid in plants. Most proceed through products of glycolysis and other metabolic pathways. For example, one pathway uses plant cell wall polymers. The principal plant ascorbic acid biosynthesis pathway seems to be via l-galactose. The enzyme l-galactose dehydrogenase catalyzes the overall oxidation to the lactone and isomerization of the lactone to the C4-hydroxyl group, resulting in l-galactono-1,4-lactone. l-Galactono-1,4-lactone then reacts with the mitochondrial flavoenzyme l-galactonolactone dehydrogenase to produce ascorbic acid. l-Ascorbic acid has a negative feedback on l-galactose dehydrogenase in spinach. Ascorbic acid efflux by embryos of dicot plants is a well-established mechanism of iron reduction and a step obligatory for iron uptake. (Note: Dicot plants transport only ferrous iron (Fe^{2+}), but if the iron circulates as ferric complexes (Fe^{3+}), it has to undergo a reduction before it can be actively transported. Plant embryos efflux high amounts of ascorbate that chemically reduce iron(III) from ferric complexes.)

All plants synthesize ascorbic acid. Ascorbic acid is a cofactor for enzymes involved in photosynthesis, synthesis of plant hormones, as an antioxidant and regenerator of other antioxidants. Plants use multiple pathways to synthesize vitamin C. The major pathway starts with glucose, fructose or mannose (all simple sugars) and proceeds to l-galactose, l-galactonolactone and ascorbic acid. This biosynthesis is regulated following a diurnal rhythm. Enzyme expression peaks in the morning to supporting biosynthesis for when mid-day sunlight intensity demands high ascorbic acid concentrations. Minor pathways may be specific to certain parts of plants; these can be either identical to the vertebrate pathway (including the GLO enzyme), or start with inositol and get to ascorbic acid via l-galactonic acid to l-galactonolactone.

=== Industrial synthesis ===
Vitamin C can be produced from glucose by two main routes. The no longer used Reichstein process, developed in the 1930s, used a single fermentation followed by a purely chemical route. The modern two-step fermentation process, originally developed in China in the 1960s, uses additional fermentation to replace part of the later chemical stages. The Reichstein process and the modern two-step fermentation processes both use glucose as the starting material, convert that to sorbitol, and then to sorbose using fermentation. The two-step fermentation process then converts sorbose to 2-keto-l-gulonic acid (KGA) through another fermentation step, avoiding an extra intermediate. Both processes yield approximately 60% vitamin C from the glucose starting point. Researchers are exploring means for one-step fermentation.

China produces about 70% of the global vitamin C market. The rest is split among European Union, India and North America. The global market was expected to exceed 141 thousand metric tons in 2024. Cost per metric ton (1000 kg) in US dollars was $2,220 in Shanghai, $2,850 in Hamburg and $3,490 in the US.

== Health effects ==
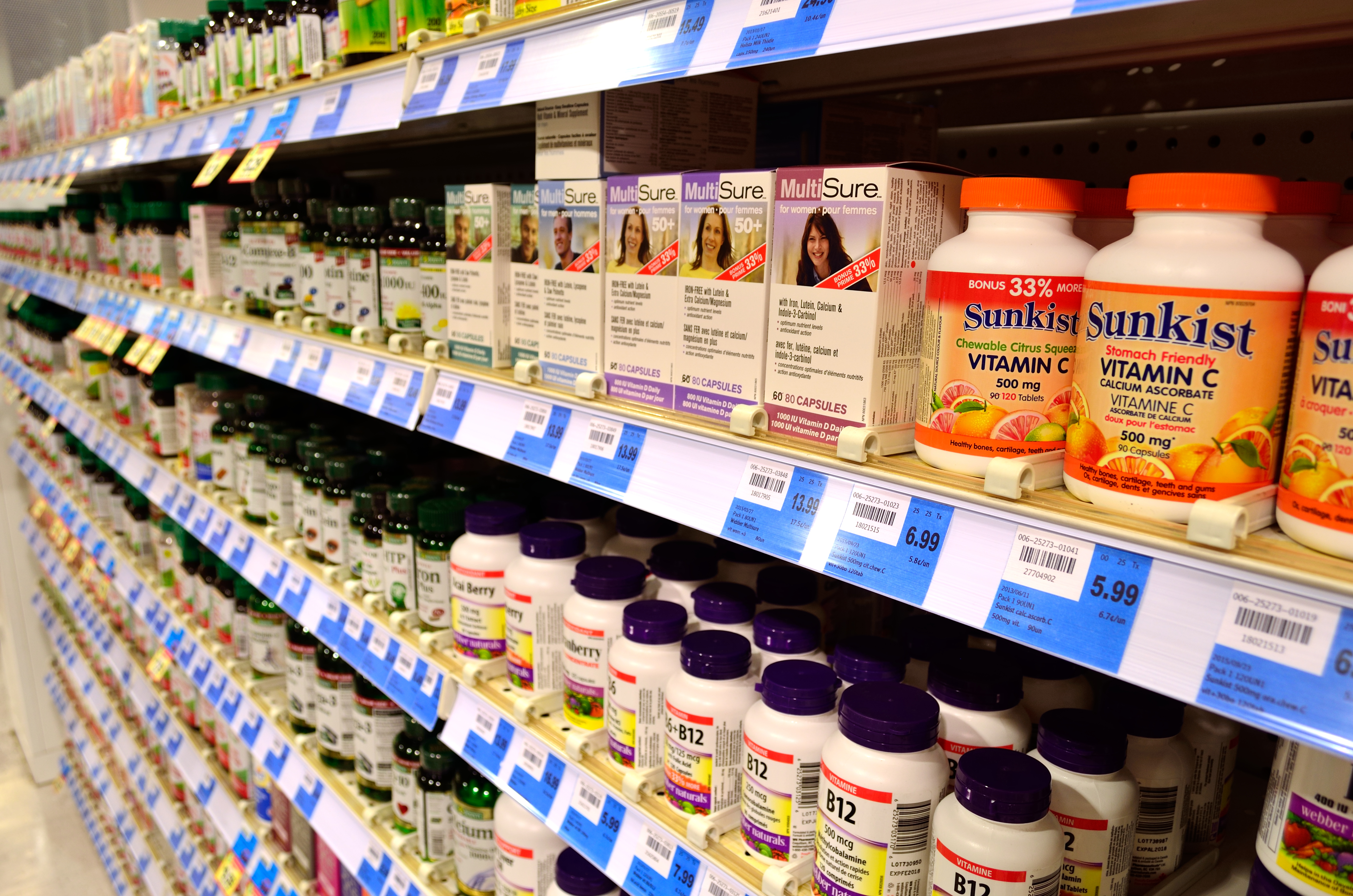
Vitamin C supplements among other dietary supplements at a US drug store

Vitamin C has a definitive role in preventing and treating scurvy, which is a disease caused by vitamin C deficiency. Beyond that, a role for vitamin C as prevention or treatment for various diseases is disputed, with reviews often reporting conflicting results. No effect of vitamin C supplementation reported for overall mortality. It is on the World Health Organization's List of Essential Medicines and on the World Health Organization's Model Forumulary. In 2023, it was the 226th most commonly prescribed medication in the United States, with more than 1 million prescriptions.

=== Scurvy ===
Scurvy is a disease resulting from a deficiency of vitamin C. Without this vitamin, collagen made by the body is too unstable to perform its function and several other enzymes in the body do not operate correctly. Early symptoms are malaise and lethargy, progressing to shortness of breath, bone pain and susceptibility to bruising. As the disease progressed, it is characterized by spots on and bleeding under the skin and bleeding gums. The skin lesions are most abundant on the thighs and legs. A person with the ailment looks pale, feels depressed, and is partially immobilized. In advanced scurvy there is fever, old wounds may become open and suppurating, loss of teeth, convulsions and, eventually, death. Until quite late in the disease the damage is reversible, as healthy collagen replaces the defective collagen with vitamin C repletion.

Notable human dietary studies of experimentally induced scurvy were conducted on conscientious objectors during World War II in Britain and on Iowa state prisoners in the late 1960s to the 1980s. Men in the prison study developed the first signs of scurvy about four weeks after starting the vitamin C-free diet, whereas in the earlier British study, six to eight months were required, possibly due to the pre-loading of this group with a 70 mg/day supplement for six weeks before the scorbutic diet was fed. Men in both studies had blood levels of ascorbic acid too low to be accurately measured by the time they developed signs of scurvy. These studies both reported that all obvious symptoms of scurvy could be completely reversed by supplementation of only 10 mg a day. Treatment of scurvy can be with vitamin C-containing foods or dietary supplements or injection.

=== Sepsis ===
People in sepsis may have micronutrient deficiencies, including low levels of vitamin C. An intravenous intake of doses much higher than the RDA, such as 3 g/d or more, appears to be needed to maintain normal plasma concentrations in people with sepsis, as the body's demand for vitamin C may increase significantly due to the heightened inflammatory response and oxidative stress. Sepsis mortality may be reduced with administration of intravenous vitamin C.

=== Common cold ===
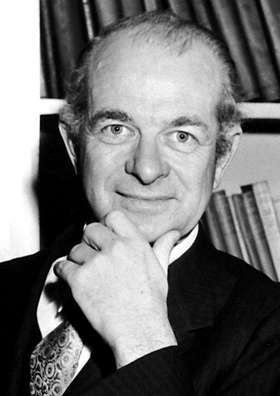
The Nobel Prize winner Linus Pauling advocated taking vitamin C for the common cold in a 1970 book.

Research on vitamin C in the common cold has been divided into effects on prevention, duration, and severity. Oral intakes of more than 200 mg/day taken on a regular basis was not effective in prevention of the common cold. Restricting analysis to trials that used at least 1000 mg/day also saw no prevention benefit. However, taking a vitamin C supplement on a regular basis did reduce the average duration of the illness by 8% in adults and 14% in children, and also reduced the severity of colds. Vitamin C taken on a regular basis reduced the duration of severe symptoms but had no effect on the duration of mild symptoms. Therapeutic use, meaning that the vitamin was not started unless people started to feel the beginnings of a cold, had no effect on the duration or severity of the illness.

Vitamin C distributes readily in high concentrations into immune cells, promotes natural killer cell activities, promotes lymphocyte proliferation, and is depleted quickly during infections, effects suggesting a prominent role in immune system function. The European Food Safety Authority concluded there is a cause and effect relationship between the dietary intake of vitamin C and functioning of a normal immune system in adults and in children under three years of age.

=== COVID-19 ===
From March through July 2020, vitamin C was the subject of more US FDA warning letters than any other ingredient for claims for prevention and/or treatment of COVID-19. In April 2021, the US National Institutes of Health (NIH) COVID-19 Treatment Guidelines stated that "there are insufficient data to recommend either for or against the use of vitamin C for the prevention or treatment of COVID-19." In an update posted December 2022, the NIH position was unchanged:

- There is insufficient evidence for the COVID-19 Treatment Guidelines Panel (the Panel) to recommend either for or against the use of vitamin C for the treatment of COVID-19 in nonhospitalized patients.
- There is insufficient evidence for the Panel to recommend either for or against the use of vitamin C for the treatment of COVID-19 in hospitalized patients.

For people hospitalized with severe COVID-19 there are reports of a significant reduction in the risk of all-cause, in-hospital mortality with the administration of vitamin C relative to no vitamin C. There were no significant differences in ventilation incidence, hospitalization duration or length of intensive care unit stay between the two groups. The majority of the trials incorporated into these meta-analyses used intravenous administration of the vitamin. Acute kidney injury was lower in people treated with vitamin C treatment. There were no differences in the frequency of other adverse events due to the vitamin. The conclusion was that further large-scale studies are needed to affirm its mortality benefits before issuing updated guidelines and recommendations.

=== Cancer ===
Higher vitamin C intake appears to reduce the risk for lung cancer. There is no evidence that vitamin C supplementation reduces the risk of prostate cancer, colorectal cancer or breast cancer.

=== Cardiovascular disease ===
There is no evidence that vitamin C supplementation decreases the risk of cardiovascular disease, although there may be an association between higher circulating vitamin C levels or dietary vitamin C and a lower risk of stroke. There is a positive effect of vitamin C on endothelial dysfunction when taken at doses greater than 500 mg per day. (The endothelium is a layer of cells that line the interior surface of blood vessels.)

=== Blood pressure ===
Serum vitamin C was reported to be 15.13 μmol/L lower in people with hypertension compared to normotensives. The vitamin was inversely associated with both systolic blood pressure (SBP) and diastolic blood pressure (DBP). Oral supplementation of the vitamin resulted in a modest but statistically significant decrease in SBP in people with hypertension. The proposed explanation is that vitamin C increases intracellular concentrations of tetrahydrobiopterin, an endothelial nitric oxide synthase cofactor that promotes the production of nitric oxide, which is a potent vasodilator. Vitamin C supplementation might also reverse the nitric oxide synthase inhibitor NG-monomethyl-L-arginine 1, and there is also evidence cited that vitamin C directly enhances the biological activity of nitric oxide.

=== Type 2 diabetes ===
There are contradictory reviews. From one, vitamin C supplementation cannot be recommended for management of type 2 diabetes. However, another reported that supplementation with high doses of vitamin C can decrease blood glucose, insulin and hemoglobin A1c.

=== Iron deficiency ===
One of the causes of iron-deficiency anemia is reduced absorption of iron. Iron absorption can be enhanced through ingestion of vitamin C alongside iron-containing food or supplements. Vitamin C helps to keep iron in the reduced ferrous state, which is more soluble and more easily absorbed. It also chelates iron into a soluble complex. It specifically helps the absorption of non-heme iron, which is found in non-meat sources and absorbed via DMT1.

=== Alzheimer's disease ===
Lower plasma vitamin C concentrations were reported in people with Alzheimer's disease. Reviews do not present reporting on supplement intervention clinical trials.

=== Eye health ===
Higher dietary intake of vitamin C was associated with lower risk of age-related cataracts. Vitamin C supplementation did not prevent age-related macular degeneration.

=== Periodontal disease ===
Low intake and low serum concentration were associated with greater progression of periodontal disease.

== Adverse effects ==
Oral intake of dietary supplements vitamin C in excess of requirements is poorly absorbed, and excess amounts in the blood are rapidly excreted in the urine, so it exhibits low acute toxicity. More than two to three grams, consumed orally, may cause nausea, abdominal cramps and diarrhea. These effects are attributed to the osmotic effect of unabsorbed vitamin C passing through the intestine. In theory, high vitamin C intake may cause excessive absorption of iron. A summary of reviews of supplementation in healthy subjects did not report this problem, but left as untested the possibility that individuals with hereditary hemochromatosis might be adversely affected.

In the 20th century, there was belief that excessive vitamin C supplementation could increase the risk of developing kidney stones. However, more recent "reports of kidney stone formation associated with excess ascorbic acid intake are limited to individuals with renal disease". A 2003 review stated that "data from epidemiological studies do not support an association between excess ascorbic acid intake and kidney stone formation in apparently healthy individuals". A 2022 review found only limited evidence that vitamin C supplementation could cause kidney stones.

There is extensive research on the purported benefits of intravenous vitamin C for treatment of sepsis, severe COVID-19 and cancer. Reviews list trials with doses as high as 24 grams per day. Concerns about possible adverse effects are that intravenous high-dose vitamin C leads to a supraphysiological level of vitamin C followed by oxidative degradation to dehydroascorbic acid and hence to oxalate, increasing the risk of oxalate kidney stones and oxalate nephropathy. The risk may be higher in people with renal impairment, as kidneys efficiently excrete excess vitamin C. Second, treatment with high dose vitamin C should be avoided in patients with glucose-6-phosphate dehydrogenase deficiency as it can lead to acute hemolysis. Third, treatment might interfere with the accuracy of glucometer measurement of blood glucose levels, as both vitamin C and glucose have similar molecular structure, which could lead to false high blood glucose readings. Despite all these concerns, meta-analyses of patients in intensive care for sepsis, septic shock, COVID-19 and other acute conditions reported no increase in new-onset kidney stones, acute kidney injury or requirement for renal replacement therapy for patients receiving short-term, high-dose, intravenous vitamin C treatment. This suggests that intravenous vitamin C is safe under these short-term applications.

== History ==
Scurvy was known to Hippocrates, described in book two of his Prorrheticorum and in his Liber de internis affectionibus, and cited by James Lind. Symptoms of scurvy were also described by Pliny the Elder: (i) Pliny. "49". Naturalis historiae. Vol. 3.; and (ii) Strabo, in Geographicorum, book 16, cited in the 1881 International Encyclopedia of Surgery.

=== Scurvy at sea ===
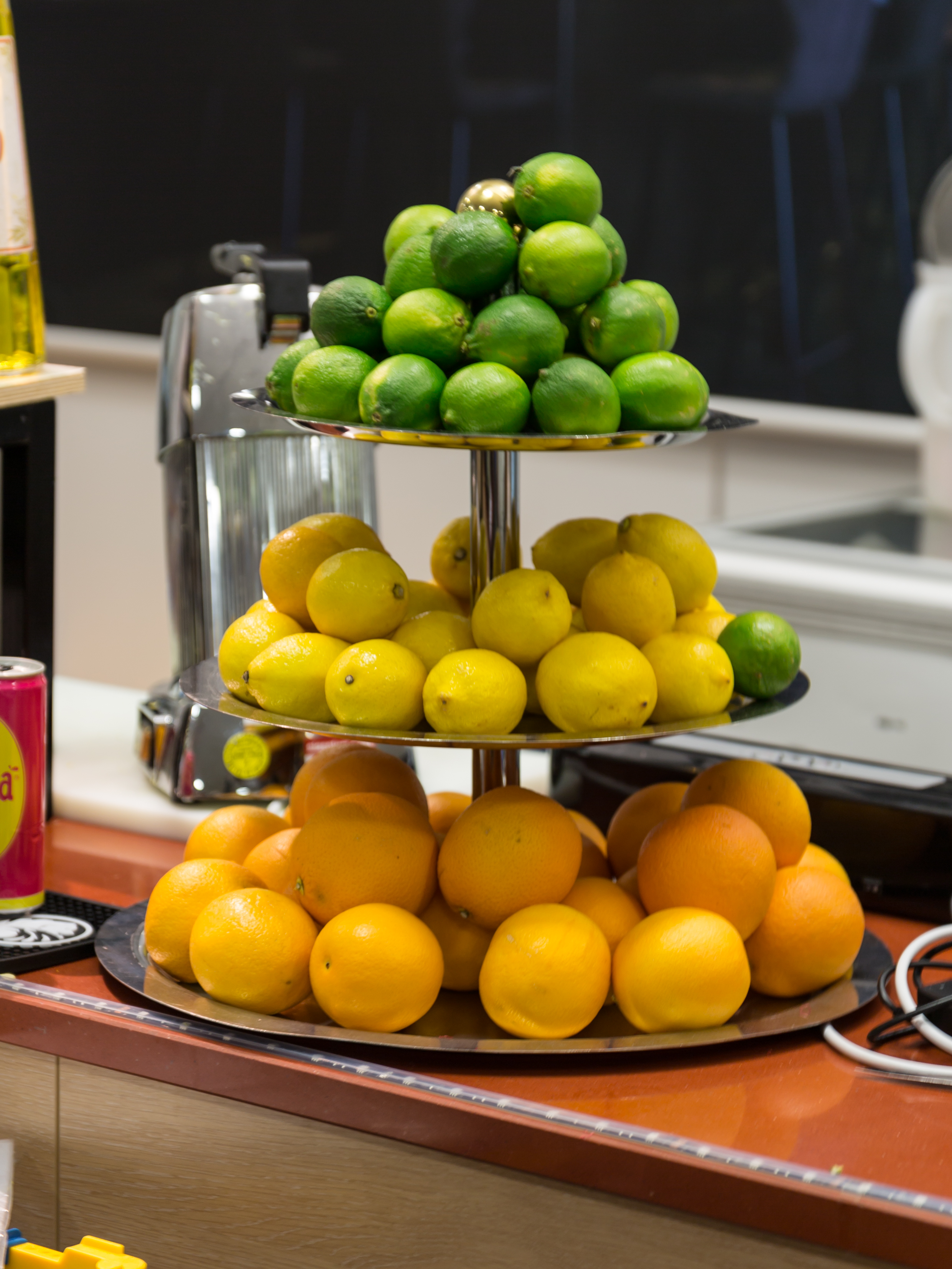
Limes, lemons and oranges were among foods identified early as preventing or treating scurvy on long sailing voyages.

In the 1497 expedition of Vasco da Gama, the curative effects of citrus fruit were known. In the 1500s, Portuguese sailors put in to the island of Saint Helena to avail themselves of planted vegetable gardens and wild-growing fruit trees. Authorities occasionally recommended plant food to prevent scurvy during long sea voyages. John Woodall, the first surgeon to the British East India Company, recommended the preventive and curative use of lemon juice in his 1617 book, The Surgeon's Mate. In 1734, the Dutch writer Johann Bachstrom gave the firm opinion, "scurvy is solely owing to a total abstinence from fresh vegetable food, and greens." Scurvy had long been a principal killer of sailors during the long sea voyages. According to Jonathan Lamb, "In 1499, Vasco da Gama lost 116 of his crew of 170; In 1520, Magellan lost 208 out of 230; ... all mainly to scurvy."

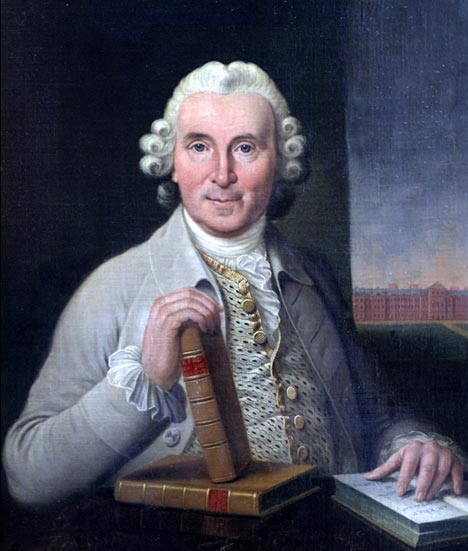
James Lind, a British Royal Navy surgeon who, in 1747, identified that a quality in fruit prevented scurvy in one of the first recorded controlled experiments

The first attempt to give scientific basis for the cause of this disease was by a ship's surgeon in the Royal Navy, James Lind. While at sea in May 1747, Lind provided some crew members with two oranges and one lemon per day, in addition to normal rations, while others continued on cider, vinegar, sulfuric acid or seawater, along with their normal rations, in one of the world's first controlled experiments. The results showed that citrus fruits prevented the disease. Lind published his work in 1753 in his Treatise on the Scurvy.

Fresh fruit was expensive to keep on board, whereas boiling it down to juice allowed easy storage, but destroyed the vitamin (especially if it was boiled in copper kettles). It was 1796 before the British navy adopted lemon juice as standard issue at sea. In 1845, ships in the West Indies were provided with lime juice instead, and in 1860 lime juice was used throughout the Royal Navy, giving rise to the American use of the nickname "limey" for the British. Captain James Cook had previously demonstrated the advantages of carrying "Sour krout" on board by taking his crew on a 1772–75 Pacific Ocean voyage without losing any of his men to scurvy. For his report on his methods the British Royal Society awarded him the Copley Medal in 1776.

The name antiscorbutic was used in the eighteenth and nineteenth centuries for foods known to prevent scurvy. These foods included lemons, limes, oranges, sauerkraut, cabbage, malt, and portable soup. In 1928, the Canadian Arctic anthropologist Vilhjalmur Stefansson showed that the Inuit avoided scurvy on a diet largely of raw meat. Later studies on traditional food diets of the Yukon First Nations, Dene, Inuit, and Métis of Northern Canada showed that their daily intake of vitamin C averaged between 52 and 62 mg/day.

=== Discovery ===
Vitamin C was discovered in 1912, isolated in 1928 and synthesized in 1933, making it the first vitamin to be synthesized. Shortly thereafter Tadeus Reichstein succeeded in synthesizing the vitamin in bulk by what is now called the Reichstein process. This made possible the inexpensive mass-production of vitamin C. In 1934, Hoffmann–La Roche bought the Reichstein process patent, trademarked synthetic vitamin C under the brand name Redoxon, and began to market it as a dietary supplement.

In 1907, a laboratory animal model which would help to identify the antiscorbutic factor was serendipitously discovered by the Norwegian physicians Axel Holst and Theodor Frølich, who when studying shipboard beriberi, fed guinea pigs their test diet of grains and flour and were surprised when scurvy resulted instead of beriberi. Unknown at that time, this species did not make its own vitamin C (being a caviomorph), whereas mice and rats do. In 1912, the Polish biochemist Casimir Funk developed the concept of vitamins. One of these was thought to be the anti-scorbutic factor. In 1928, this was referred to as "water-soluble C", although its chemical structure had not been determined.

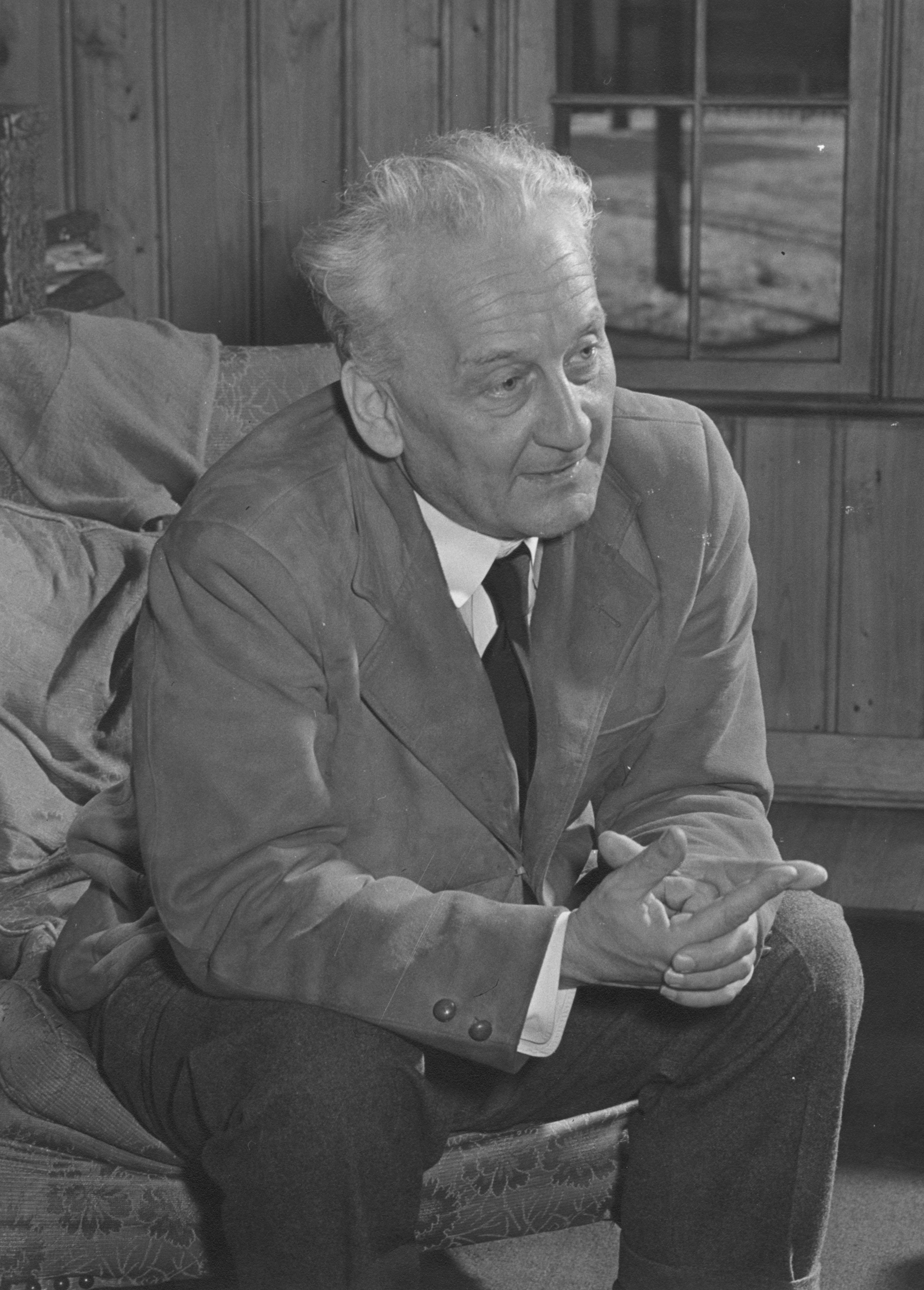
Albert Szent-Györgyi, pictured here in 1948, was awarded the 1937 Nobel Prize in Medicine "for his discoveries in connection with the biological combustion processes, with special reference to vitamin C and the catalysis of fumaric acid".

From 1928 to 1932, Albert Szent-Györgyi and Joseph L. Svirbely's Hungarian team, and Charles Glen King's American team, identified the anti-scorbutic factor. Szent-Györgyi isolated hexuronic acid from animal adrenal glands, and suspected it to be the antiscorbutic factor. In late 1931, Szent-Györgyi gave Svirbely the last of his adrenal-derived hexuronic acid with the suggestion that it might be the anti-scorbutic factor. By the spring of 1932, King's laboratory had proven this, but published the result without giving Szent-Györgyi credit for it. This led to a bitter dispute over priority. In 1933, Walter Norman Haworth chemically identified the vitamin as l-hexuronic acid, proving this by synthesis in 1933. Haworth and Szent-Györgyi proposed that L-hexuronic acid be named a-scorbic acid, and chemically l-ascorbic acid, in honor of its activity against scurvy. The term's etymology is from Latin, "a-" meaning away, or off from, while -scorbic is from Medieval Latin scorbuticus (pertaining to scurvy), cognate with Old Norse skyrbjugr, French scorbut, Dutch scheurbuik and Low German scharbock. Partly for this discovery, Szent-Györgyi was awarded the 1937 Nobel Prize in Medicine, and Haworth shared that year's Nobel Prize in Chemistry.

In 1957, J. J. Burns showed that some mammals are susceptible to scurvy as their liver does not produce the enzyme l-gulonolactone oxidase, the last of the chain of four enzymes that synthesize vitamin C. American biochemist Irwin Stone was the first to exploit vitamin C for its food preservative properties. He later developed the idea that humans possess a mutated form of the l-gulonolactone oxidase coding gene. Stone introduced Linus Pauling to the theory that humans needed to consume vitamin C in quantities far higher than what was considered a recommended daily intake in order to optimize health.

In 2008, researchers discovered that in humans and other primates the red blood cells have evolved a mechanism to more efficiently use the vitamin C present in the body by recycling oxidized l-dehydroascorbic acid (DHA) back into ascorbic acid for reuse by the body. The mechanism was not found to be present in mammals that synthesize their own vitamin C.

=== History of large dose therapies ===
Vitamin C megadosage is a term describing the consumption or injection of vitamin C in doses comparable to or higher than the amounts produced by the livers of mammals which are able to synthesize vitamin C. An argument for this, although not the actual term, was described in 1970 in an article by Linus Pauling. Briefly, his position was that for optimal health, humans should be consuming at least 2,300 mg/day to compensate for the inability to synthesize vitamin C. The recommendation also fell into the consumption range for gorillas—a non-synthesizing near-relative to humans. A second argument for high intake is that serum ascorbic acid concentrations increase as intake increases until it plateaus at about 190 to 200 micromoles per liter (μmol/L) once consumption exceeds 1,250 milligrams. As noted, government recommendations are a range of 40 to 110 mg/day and normal plasma is approximately 50 μmol/L, so "normal" is about 25% of what can be achieved when oral consumption is in the proposed megadose range.

Pauling popularized the concept of high dose vitamin C as prevention and treatment of the common cold in 1970. A few years later he proposed that vitamin C would prevent cardiovascular disease, and that 10 grams/day, initially administered intravenously and thereafter orally, would cure late-stage cancer. Mega-dosing with ascorbic acid has other champions, among them chemist Irwin Stone and the controversial Matthias Rath and Patrick Holford, who both have been accused of making unsubstantiated treatment claims for treating cancer and HIV infection. The idea that large amounts of intravenous ascorbic acid can improve outcomes of late-stage cancer or ameliorate the toxicity of chemotherapy is—some forty years after Pauling's seminal paper—still considered unproven and still in need of high quality research.

== Research directions ==
=== Cancer research ===
There is research investigating whether high dose intravenous vitamin C administration as a co-treatment will suppress cancer stem cells, which are responsible for tumor recurrence, metastasis and chemoresistance.

=== Skin aging research ===
There is also ongoing research on topical application of vitamin C to prevent signs of skin aging. Human skin physiologically contains small amounts of vitamin C, which supports collagen synthesis, decreases collagen degradation, and assists in antioxidant protection against UV-induced photo-aging, including photocarcinogenesis. This knowledge is often used as a rationale for the marketing of vitamin C as a topical "serum" ingredient to prevent or treat facial skin aging, melasma (dark pigmented spots), and wrinkles; however, these claims are unsubstantiated and are not supported by research conducted so far; the supposed efficacy of topical treatment as opposed to oral intake is poorly understood. The purported mechanism on supposed benefit of topical vitamin C application to slow skin aging is that vitamin C is an antioxidant, neutralizing free radicals from sunlight exposure, air pollutants or normal metabolic processes. The clinical trial literature is characterized as insufficient to support health claims; one reason being put forward was that "All the studies used vitamin C in combination with other ingredients or therapeutic mechanisms, thereby complicating any specific conclusions regarding the efficacy of vitamin C."

==== Pneumonia ====
Whether prophylactic vitamin C treatment prevents or treats pneumonia has not been established by the trial evidence available.
