= Redoxon =

Brand name of the artificially synthesized vitamin C

Clinical data
- Trade names: Redoxon

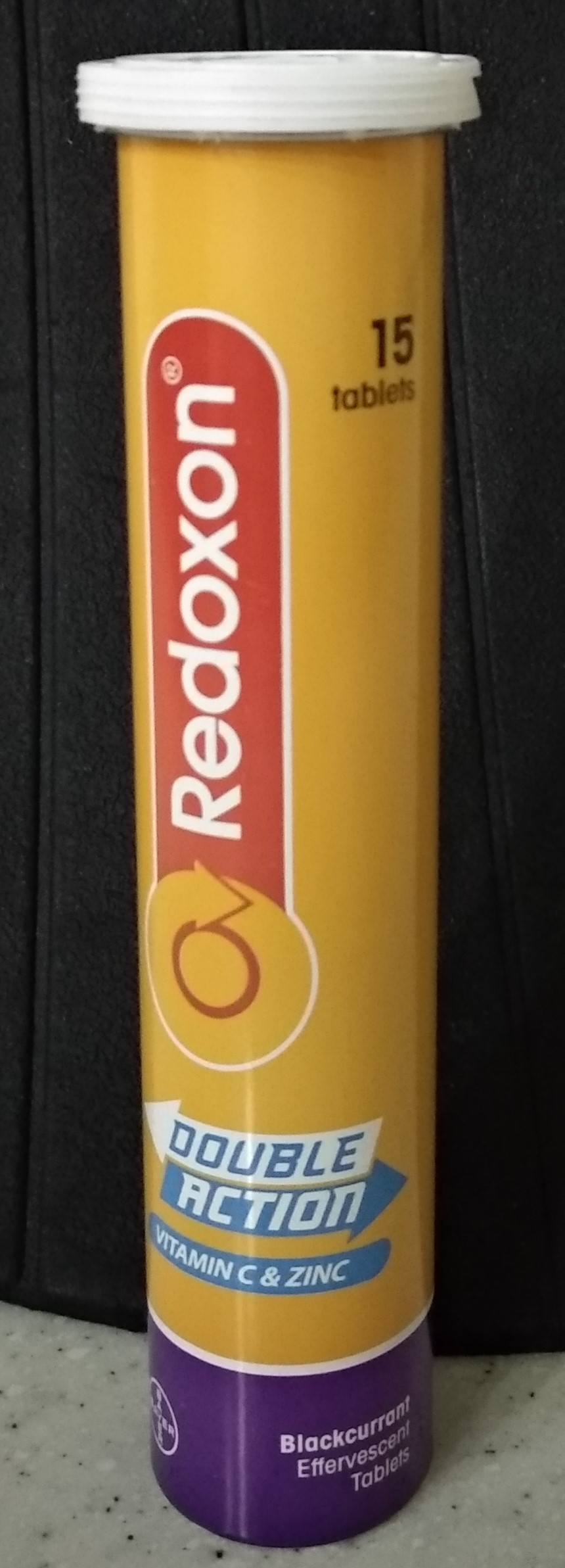
Redoxon Double Action Vitamin C standard tablets

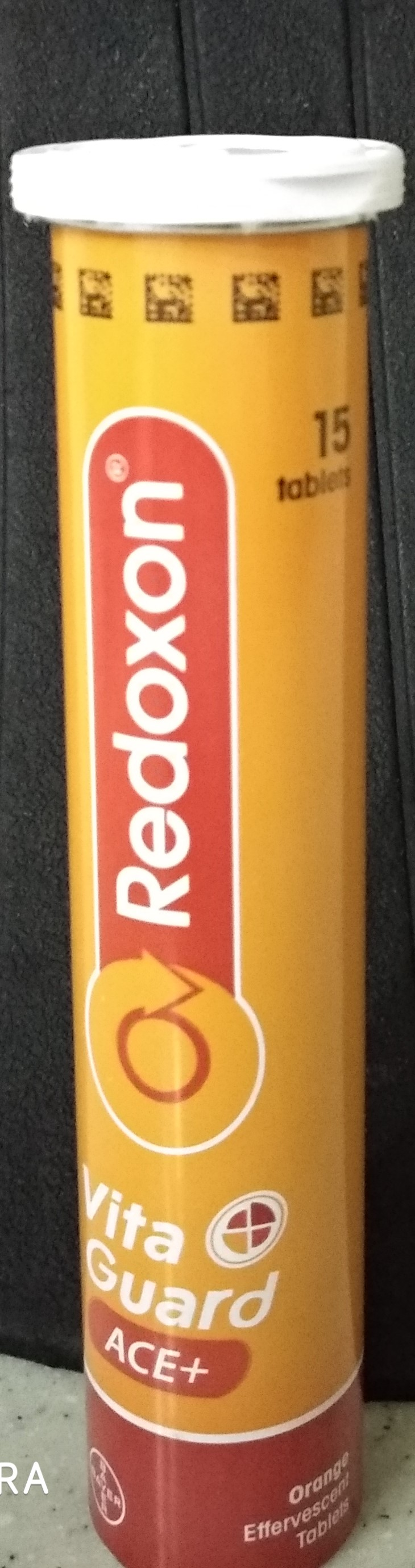
Redoxon Vita Guard Ace+ Vitamin C standard tablets

Redoxon is the brand name of the first artificially synthesized ascorbic acid (vitamin C). Redoxon was first marketed to the general public by Roche in 1934, making it the first mass-manufactured synthetic vitamin in history. The brand is now owned by German pharmaceutical company Bayer and is sold in many countries.

== History ==
The product was developed by a team headed by chemist Tadeusz Reichstein, who discovered a method of synthesizing 30-40 grams of vitamin C from 100 grams of glucose. This used an intermediate step of creating sorbose using a bacterial fermentation method discovered by a French researcher, Gabriel Bertrand. In this method, fruit flies were attracted to a mixture of wine, vinegar, yeast bouillon, and sorbitol, a substance easily chemically prepared from glucose. Flies that fed upon sorbitol as a major food substrate excreted bacteria that were able to synthesize sorbose from sorbitol. The bacteria species was isolated, cultured and used in a fermentation process to make sorbose. From sorbose, chemical reactions were used to complete the synthesis of ascorbic acid.

Despite concern about starting with a wild strain of bacteria for fermentation production of sorbose, the process was superior in cost and yield to a rival method by Albert Szent-Györgyi that isolated vitamin C from capsicum (peppers). After the sale of the Reichstein process patent to Hoffmann-La Roche, this process became the basis of the corporation's large-scale production of vitamin C.

The present-day Redoxon tablets are compounded from ascorbic acid and sodium bicarbonate. When these are added to water, they react to produce sodium ascorbate, water and carbon dioxide, thus producing an effervescence. Some versions of Redoxon contain additional nutrients.
