= Ascorbyl stearate =

Names
- IUPAC name L-threo-Hex-2-enono-1,4-lactone 6-octadecanoate
- Systematic IUPAC name (2S)-2-[(2R)-3,4-Dihydroxy-5-oxo-2,5-dihydrofuran-2-yl]-2-hydroxyethyl octadecanoate
- Other names E305; L-Ascorbic acid, 6-octadecanoate Ascorbyl monooctadecanoate

Identifiers
CAS Number	10605-09-1
3D model (JSmol)	Interactive image
ChEMBL	ChEMBL218804
ChemSpider	18619275
ECHA InfoCard	100.031.107
EC Number	234-231-5
E number	E305 (antioxidants, ...)
PubChem CID	54725318
UNII	7Z1QT341US
CompTox Dashboard (EPA)	DTXSID00894148 DTXSID60909883, DTXSID00894148
- InChI: InChI=1S/C24H42O7/c1-2-3-4-5-6-7-8-9-10-11-12-13-14-15-16-17-20(26)30-18-19(25)23-21(27)22(28)24(29)31-23/h19,23,25,27-28H,2-18H2,1H3/t19-,23+/m0/s1 Key: LITUBCVUXPBCGA-WMZHIEFXSA-N
- SMILES: OC([C@]([C@@H](O)COC(CCCCCCCCCCCCCCCCC)=O)([H])O1)=C(O)C1=O

Properties
Chemical formula	C_{24}H_{42}O_{7}
Molar mass	442.593 g·mol^{−1}
- Except where otherwise noted, data are given for materials in their standard state (at 25 °C [77 °F], 100 kPa). verify (what is ?) Infobox references

Ascorbyl stearate (C_{24}H_{42}O_{7}) is an ester formed from ascorbic acid and stearic acid. In addition to its use as a source of vitamin C, it is used as an antioxidant food additive in margarine (E number E305). The USDA limits its use to 0.02% individually or in conjunction with other antioxidants.

== See also ==
- Ascorbyl palmitate
- Mineral ascorbates
