= Mineral ascorbates =

Ascorbic acid

Mineral ascorbates are a group of salts of ascorbic acid (vitamin C). They are composed of a mineral cation bonded to ascorbate (the anion of ascorbic acid).

== Production ==
Mineral ascorbates are powders manufactured by reacting ascorbic acid with mineral carbonates in aqueous solutions, venting the carbon dioxide, drying the reaction product, and then milling the dried product to the desired particle size.

The choice of the mineral carbonates can be calcium carbonate, potassium carbonate, sodium bicarbonate, magnesium carbonate, or many other mineral forms.

== Uses ==
Mineral ascorbates are used as dietary supplements and food additives, and drugs. An example of a mineral ascorbate drug is sodium ascorbate injections, as the acid form (ascorbic acid) of vitamin C is too acidic for injections.

Ascorbate salts may be better tolerated by the human body than the corresponding weakly acidic ascorbic acid.

Ascorbates are highly reactive antioxidants used as food preservatives.

Examples of mineral ascorbates are:

- Sodium ascorbate (E301)
- Calcium ascorbate (E302)
- Potassium ascorbate (E303)
- Magnesium ascorbate

== See also ==
- Ascorbyl palmitate
- Ascorbyl stearate
