= C12H14CaO12 =

The molecular formula C_{12}H_{14}CaO_{12} (molar mass: 390.310 g/mol, exact mass: 390.0111 u) may refer to:

- Calcium ascorbate
- Calcium erythorbate
