= Reichstein process =

Chemical process

The Reichstein process in chemistry is a combined chemical and microbial method for the production of ascorbic acid from D-glucose in five steps. This process was devised by Nobel Prize winner Tadeusz Reichstein and his colleagues in 1933 while working in the laboratory of the ETH in Zürich.

== Reaction steps ==
The reaction steps are:

- hydrogenation of D-glucose to D-sorbitol, an organic reaction with nickel as a catalyst under high temperature and high pressure.
- Microbial oxidation or fermentation of sorbitol to L-sorbose with acetobacter at pH 4-6 and 30 °C.
- protection of the 4 hydroxyl groups in sorbose by formation of the acetal with acetone and an acid to Diacetone-L-sorbose (2,3:4,6−Diisopropyliden−α−L−sorbose)
- Organic oxidation with potassium permanganate (to Diprogulic acid) followed by heating with water gives the 2-Keto-L-gulonic acid
- The final step is a ring-closing step or gamma lactonization with removal of water.
- Intermediate 5 can also be prepared directly from 3 with oxygen and platinum

The microbial oxidation of sorbitol to sorbose is important because it provides the correct stereochemistry.

== Importance ==
This process was patented and sold to Hoffmann-La Roche in 1934. The first commercially sold vitamin C product was either Cebion from Merck or Redoxon from Hoffmann-La Roche.

Even today industrial methods for the production of ascorbic acid can be based on the Reichstein process. In modern methods however, sorbose is directly oxidized with a platinum catalyst (developed by Kurt Heyns (1908–2005) in 1942). This method avoids the use of protective groups. A side product with particular modification is 5-Keto-D-gluconic acid.

A shorter biotechnological synthesis of ascorbic acid was announced in 1988 by Genencor International and Eastman Chemical. Glucose is converted to 2-keto-L-gulonic acid in two steps (via 2,4-diketo-L-gulonic acid intermediate) as compared to five steps in the traditional process.

Though many organisms synthesize their own vitamin C, the steps can be different in plants and mammals. Smirnoff concluded that “..little is known about many of the enzymes involved in ascorbate biosynthesis or about the factors controlling flux through the pathways". There is interest in finding alternatives to the Reichstein process. Experiments suggest that genetically modified bacteria might be commercially usable.

== Literature ==
- Boudrant, J (May 1990). "Microbial processes for ascorbic acid biosynthesis: a review". Enzyme Microb. Technol. 12: 322–9. PMID 1366548.
- Bremus, C; Herrmann, U; Bringer-Meyer, S; Sahm, H (June 2006). "The use of microorganisms in L-ascorbic acid production". J. Biotechnol. 124: 196–205. doi:10.1016/j.jbiotec.2006.01.010. PMID 16516325.
