= Potassium ascorbate =

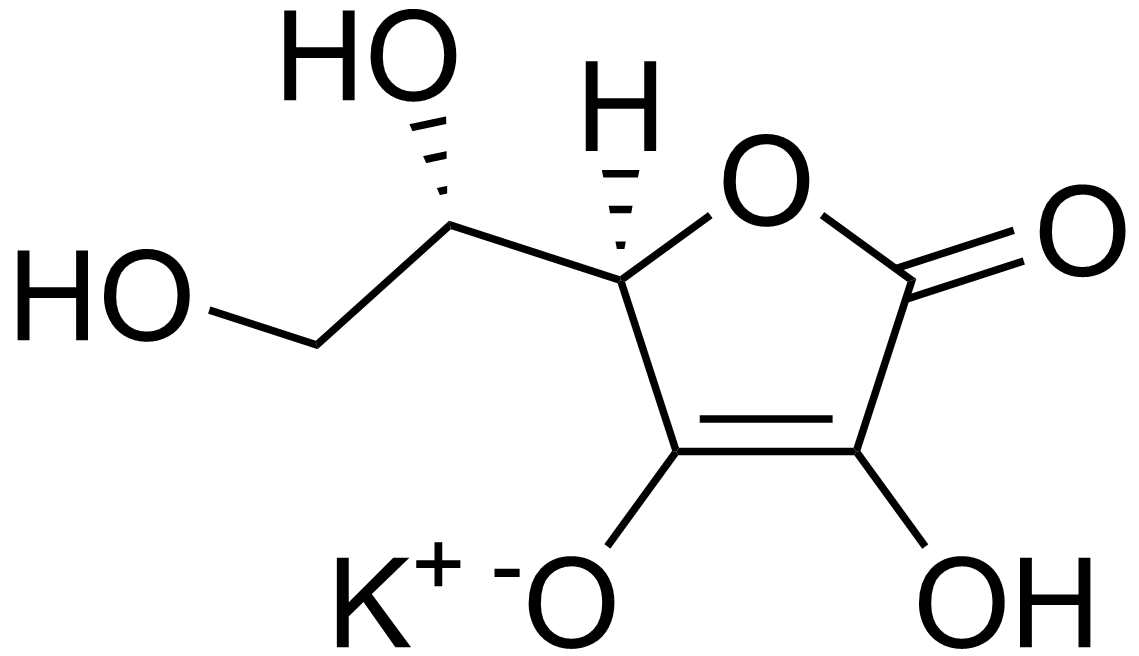

Names
- Preferred IUPAC name Potassium (2R)-2-[(1S)-1,2-dihydroxyethyl]-4-hydroxy-5-oxo-2,5-dihydrofuran-3-olate
- Other names Monopotassium ascorbate; Potassium L-ascorbate

Identifiers
CAS Number	15421-15-5
3D model (JSmol)	Interactive image
ChemSpider	30647045
ECHA InfoCard	100.035.832
E number	E303 (antioxidants, ...)
PubChem CID	23687519
UNII	X5523762RI
CompTox Dashboard (EPA)	DTXSID80165560
- InChI: InChI=1S/C6H8O6.K/c7-1-2(8)5-3(9)4(10)6(11)12-5;/h2,5,7-10H,1H2;/q;+1/p-1/t2-,5+;/m0./s1 Key: CONVKSGEGAVTMB-RXSVEWSESA-M
- SMILES: OC1=C([O-])[C@]([C@@H](O)CO)([H])OC1=O.[K+]

Properties
Chemical formula	C_{6}H_{7}KO_{6}
Molar mass	214.214 g·mol^{−1}
Solubility in water	98g/100mL
- Except where otherwise noted, data are given for materials in their standard state (at 25 °C [77 °F], 100 kPa). verify (what is ?) Infobox references

Potassium ascorbate is a compound with formula KC_{6}H_{7}O_{6}. It is the potassium salt of ascorbic acid (vitamin C) and a mineral ascorbate. As a food additive, it has E number E303, INS number 303. Although it is not a permitted food additive in the UK, the USA and the EU, it is approved for use in Australia and New Zealand. According to some studies, it has shown a strong antioxidant activity and antitumoral properties.
