= Diprogulic acid =

Names
- Preferred IUPAC name (3aS,3bR,7aS,8aR)-2,2,5,5-Tetramethyltetrahydro-2H,5H,8aH-[1,3]dioxolo[4′,5′:4,5]furo[3,2-d][1,3]dioxole-8a-carboxylic acid
- Other names: Dikegulac acid; Diacetone-2-ketogulonic acid; Oxogulonic acid diacetonide; Sodium dikegulac; Sodium diprogulate

Identifiers
CAS Number	18467-77-1; 52508-35-7 (sodium)
3D model (JSmol)	Interactive image
ChemSpider	58884; 58883 (sodium)
ECHA InfoCard	100.038.484
EC Number	257-976-8
PubChem CID	65420; 23667639 (sodium)
UNII	3981541LXD; 3M4815901H (sodium)
CompTox Dashboard (EPA)	DTXSID0047454
- InChI: InChI=1S/C12H18O7/c1-10(2)15-5-6-7(17-10)8-12(16-6,9(13)14)19-11(3,4)18-8/h6-8H,5H2,1-4H3,(H,13,14)/t6-,7+,8-,12+/m0/s1 Key: FWCBATIDXGJRMF-FLNNQWSLSA-N
- SMILES: CC1(OC[C@H]2[C@@H](O1)[C@H]3[C@@](O2)(OC(O3)(C)C)C(=O)O)C

Properties
Chemical formula	C_{12}H_{18}O_{7}
Molar mass	274.269 g·mol^{−1}
Appearance	White/colorless solid
- Except where otherwise noted, data are given for materials in their standard state (at 25 °C [77 °F], 100 kPa). Infobox references

Diprogulic acid (also known as dikegulac) is a precursor used in commercial ascorbic acid production. In agriculture, its sodium salt, dikegulac sodium, is used as a plant growth regulator, primarily used as a branching agent. When it is taken up by a plant, dikegulac sodium is translocated to its apical meristems, where it inhibits DNA synthesis. This suppresses apical dominance in the plant and can stimulate lateral branching, resulting in a bushier growth habit. Dikegulac sodium is sometimes used to inhibit fruiting and flowering.

== Application methods ==
Dikegulac sodium can be applied as a foliar spray or a trunk injection.

== Phytotoxicity ==
Dikegulac sodium application sometimes causes phytotoxicity. Symptoms include chlorosis and stunted growth. When higher concentrations are applied, there is a greater risk that these adverse effects will persist, leading to crop loss.

== Reversing growth inhibition ==
Gibberellins can be applied to fight undesired growth inhibition following dikegulac sodium application, but success can be limited.

== Regulations ==
Plant protection products containing dikegulac were phased out in the European Union after the European Commission decided in 2002 not to include the chemical in Annex I to Directive 91/414/EEC.

Dikegulac sodium is approved for EPA registration in the United States.

== Commercial formulations ==
Commercial formulations available in the United States include Atrimmec, Augeo, and Pinscher.

== Ginkgo Gate ==
In Fall 2008, Washington, D.C.'s Urban Forestry Administration failed to suppress the fruiting of thousands of female Ginkgo biloba trees by injecting them with the dikegulac sodium product Pinscher.

Ginkgo biloba is a dioecious plant. Because the females are well known for their foul smelling fruit, the non-fruiting males are usually recommended for landscape use. However, these city trees were installed before Ginkgo saplings could easily be sexed, so many planted were female.

The Urban Forestry Administration had previously sprayed the trees with chlorpropham to prevent fruiting, but their success had been limited. When the dikegulac sodium injection was unsuccessful, the fruit matured and dropped from the trees. Some referred to the failure as "Ginkgo Gate".
