= Ascorbyl palmitate =

Names
- IUPAC name L-threo-Hex-2-enono-1,4-lactone 6-hexadecanoate
- Systematic IUPAC name (2S)-2-[(2R)-3,4-Dihydroxy-5-oxo-2,5-dihydrofuran-2-yl]-2-hydroxyethyl hexadecanoate
- Other names Ascorbyl palmitate L-Ascorbic acid 6-hexadecanoate 6-O-Palmitoylascorbic acid

Identifiers
CAS Number	137-66-6
3D model (JSmol)	Interactive image
Abbreviations	E304
ChEMBL	ChEMBL220190
ChemSpider	16736579
ECHA InfoCard	100.004.824
E number	E304 (antioxidants, ...)
PubChem CID	5282506
UNII	QN83US2B0N
CompTox Dashboard (EPA)	DTXSID3041611
- InChI: InChI=1S/C22H38O7/c1-2-3-4-5-6-7-8-9-10-11-12-13-14-15-18(24)28-16-17(23)21-19(25)20(26)22(27)29-21/h17,21,23,25-26H,2-16H2,1H3/t17-,21+/m0/s1 Key: QAQJMLQRFWZOBN-LAUBAEHRSA-N; InChI=1/C22H38O7/c1-2-3-4-5-6-7-8-9-10-11-12-13-14-15-18(24)28-16-17(23)21-19(25)20(26)22(27)29-21/h17,21,23,25-26H,2-16H2,1H3/t17-,21+/m0/s1 Key: QAQJMLQRFWZOBN-LAUBAEHRBD
- SMILES: OC=1[C@H](OC(=O)C=1O)[C@@H](O)COC(=O)CCCCCCCCCCCCCCC

Properties
Chemical formula	C_{22}H_{38}O_{7}
Molar mass	414.539 g·mol^{−1}
Appearance	White to yellowish colored powder
Melting point	116 to 117 °C (241 to 243 °F; 389 to 390 K)
Solubility in water	Very slightly soluble in water; freely soluble in ethanol

Hazards
Flash point	178.1 °C (352.6 °F; 451.2 K)
- Except where otherwise noted, data are given for materials in their standard state (at 25 °C [77 °F], 100 kPa). verify (what is ?) Infobox references

Ascorbyl palmitate is an ester formed from ascorbic acid and palmitic acid creating a fat-soluble form of vitamin C. In addition to its use as a source of vitamin C, it is also used as an antioxidant food additive (E number E304). It is approved for use as a food additive in the EU, the U.S., Canada, Australia, and New Zealand.

Ascorbyl palmitate is also marketed as "vitamin C ester". It is synthesized by acylation of vitamin C using different acyl donors.

== See also ==
- Ascorbyl stearate
- Vitamin C
- Mineral ascorbates
