= Lithium ascorbate =

Lithium salt with ascorbate

Lithium Ascorbate
- Li-Ascorbate

Names
- Preferred IUPAC name lithium;(2R)-2-[(1S)-1,2-dihydroxyethyl]-4-hydroxy-5-oxo-2H-furan-3-olate
- Other names Lithium ascorbate, LiAsc

Identifiers
| CAS Number | 80781-74-4 |
| 3D model (JSmol) | Interactive image |
| ChemSpider | 67165160 |
| PubChem CID | 133064423 |
- InChI: InChI=1S/C6H8O6.Li/c7-1-2(8)5-3(9)4(10)6(11)12-5;/h2,5,7-10H,1H2;/q;+1/p-1/t2-,5+;/m0./s1 Key: IHAQDFLGBNNAEH-RXSVEWSESA-M
- SMILES: [Li+].C([C@@H]([C@@H]1C(=C(C(=O)O1)O)[O-])O)O

Properties
| Chemical formula | C_{6}H_{7}LiO_{6} |
| Molar mass | 182.1 g/mol |
| Density | 1.62 g/cm^{3} |
| Melting point | 185 to 190 °C (365 to 374 °F; 458 to 463 K) |
| Solubility in water | 0.39 g/100 mL (25 °C) |
| Solubility | Insoluble in acetone, ammonia, alcohol |

Pharmacology
| ATC code | A11GB (WHO) |

Hazards
| NFPA 704 (fire diamond) | 1 0 0 |
| Flash point | 190 °C (374 °F; 463 K) |
- Lethal dose or concentration (LD, LC)
| LD_{50} (median dose) | 6334 mg/kg (oral, rat) |
- Except where otherwise noted, data are given for materials in their standard state (at 25 °C [77 °F], 100 kPa). Infobox references

Lithium ascorbate is a salt of lithium with an organic anion, ascorbate. It is used as a component of lithium-containing food supplements. Pharmacotherapy of bipolar disorder widely employs lithium carbonate for more than 60 years. The toxicity of the latter (LD50 = 525 mg/kg per os) stimulates search for effective and non-toxic lithium salts. A chemoreactomic screening of 1245 water-soluble lithium salts with organic anions made it possible to identify 11 low-toxic lithium salts (LD50 > 1000 mg/kg) with high bioavailability (>20%: ascorbate, nicotinate, hydroxybutyrate, orotate, citrate, gluconate, comenate, pyroglutamate, glycinate, asparaginate, lactate). Among these, lithium ascorbate was characterized by more prominent inhibition of serotonin and dopamine reuptake and by an affinity for inhibition of glutamate and beta-adrenergic receptors. Chemoreactomic analysis showed that lithium ascorbate can also be characterized by anti-inflammatory action (due to the modulation of prostaglandin metabolism), have moderate anticoagulant, antihyperlipidemic, antihyperglycemic and antitumor effects. Biodistribution and toxicity have been studied in experimental and clinical studies; the antioxidant, neuroprotective, antitumor and adaptogenic effects of lithium ascorbate have been confirmed.

== Biodistribution and mechanisms of action ==
Lithium compartmentalization was studied in 11 biosubstrates of rats when lithium ascorbate was taken at a dose of 1000 mg/kg. As part of a tubeless analysis of the dynamics of concentrations in whole blood, the following values of the pharmacokinetic parameters of lithium ascorbate were obtained: Cmax=50.59 µg/l, tmax=1.50 h, Clast=33.7 µg/l, AUCt=1750 µg/l*h, MRTt=22.9 h, Lz=0.005 1/h, T1/2=141 h, CL=0.029 l/h, Vd=5.9 l. Multichamber pharmacokinetic analysis showed that the stabilization of lithium levels in the blood is maintained by a special "depot" of lithium, apparently consisting of the aorta, femur and brain.

Application of the method of functional linkage analysis suggested that the targeted accumulation of ascorbate anion in cells is due to the activity of vitamin C transport proteins SLC23A1, SLC23A2, SLC23A3. At the same time, lithium ions and ascorbate exhibit a synergistic effect. The main effects of lithium include the support of normal excitability central nervous system: by preventing excessive concentration of norepinephrine, regulation of sodium concentration in muscle cells (which is important for the tone of blood vessels), sensitivity of neurons to dopamine, which reduces the negative impact of stress. In addition to antioxidant actions, ascorbate anion, with its targeted accumulation in the brain and adrenal glands, also modulates the activity of dopamineergic, serotoninergic, GABA-ergic, glutamateergic neurotransmission and might be useful in the treatment of schizophrenia, major depressive disorder, bipolar disorder.

== Toxicity ==
Studies of the acute and chronic toxicity of lithium ascorbate have shown that lithium ascorbate is characterized by an extremely low acute and chronic toxicity. In acute toxicity studies with a single dose of 3000 mg/kg of lithium ascorbate, mortality was 0%, no pathological changes were found, as well as signs of local irritant action. At 4000 mg/kg, mortality (delayed) was 20%. Intoxication in males was manifested as oppression, diarrhea, ruffled hair, bloody discharge from the nose and eyes, in females - diarrhea. Pathological changes included plethora of the meninges, edema and plethora of the lungs, hemorrhages in the lungs. For Wistar rats LD50 of lithium ascorbate was 6334 mg/kg of body weight, and LD100 was 8000 mg/kg. Thus, lithium ascorbate can be classified as class 5 "practically non-toxic compounds" (LD50> 5000 mg/kg). Compared with lithium carbonate (LD50 = 531 mg/kg), lithium ascorbate is 12 times less toxic.

It is known that the anion, which forms a lithium salt, is one of the most significant factors affecting the toxicity of the salt. For example, for rats, the LD50 of lithium chloride when administered orally is 1530 mg/kg, and when administered intraperitoneally it is 925 mg/kg. For rabbits, the LD50 of the same salt is 775 mg/kg orally. The greatest acute toxicity was established for lithium fluoride (LD50=175 mg/kg, for mice), while bromide, nicotinate, oxybutyrate are much less toxic (LD50 for mice - 2200 mg/kg). The anionic component of the salt has a certain significance in the manifestation of both general toxic and embryotoxic and teratogenic effects of lithium salts. For example, lithium oxybutyrate is characterized by a more pronounced general toxic effect at almost all times of administration and embryotoxic effect when administered during the period of organogenesis. Lithium carbonate has a more pronounced effect when administered at the early stages of embryogenesis.

== Antioxidant effect ==
Lithium ascorbate normalizes the neurohumoral status with similar physiological effects at the level of the antioxidant system of the animal organism, reducing the blood levels of the main stress hormone adrenaline, norepinephrine and cortisol. The addition of lithium ascorbate to the diet of pregnant sows of Irish Landrace breed led to an increase in the antioxidant status of farrowing sows and a decrease in the level of lipid peroxidation. The use of lithium ascorbate caused a significant increase in the level of reduced glutathione by 21% and a decrease in the level of malondialdehyde by 60%. The introduction of lithium ascorbate with feed to sows and fattening pigs at dosages of 10, 5 and 2 mg/kg maintained the dynamics of stress hormones at the physiological level. In pregnant sows, it normalizes the concentration of progesterone, and has a positive effect on reproductive function, non-specific immunity, being a protector against technological and spontaneous stressors. Lithium ascorbate had a positive effect on lipid-cholesterol metabolism, antioxidant status, increased the level of general reactivity of the body, increased the level of hemoglobin, erythrocytes and lymphocytes, mobilized energy resources, enhanced the bactericidal and phagocytic activity of cellular elements, contributed to the performance of protective functions by gamma globulins in the system of nonspecific immunity. The combined intake of carnosine and lithium ascorbate contributed to the reduction of ethanol-induced oxidative damage to plasma proteins and lipids.

== Adaptogenic and neuroprotective effects ==
A neurocytological study of granular cerebellar neurons in culture under conditions of moderate glutamate stress showed that lithium ascorbate is more effective in maintaining neuronal survival than inorganic lithium salts (chloride, carbonate). Under conditions of glutamate stress, lithium ascorbate at concentrations of 0.2–1.0 mM significantly and dose-dependently increased the survival of neurons: the most pronounced neuroprotective effect was observed at an ascorbate concentration of 1 mM (by 11%). The use of lithium ascorbate even at the minimum concentration (0.1 mM) resulted in a significant difference in neuron survival (p=0.049 according to the Kolmogorov-Smirnov test). The use of a non-lithium salt of ascorbic acid (potassium ascorbate) was characterized by a much less pronounced neuroprotective effect. Inhibition of glycogen synthase kinase syntentase-3 (GSK-3) and induction of brain-derived neurotrophic factors are the main mechanisms of the neuroprotective action of lithium salts. In addition, by inhibiting NMDA receptors, lithium ions can regulate calcium homeostasis and inhibit the activation of calcium-dependent apotosis, also showing synergy with neuropeptides. In broiler chickens, the use of lithium ascorbate from the 14th to the 42nd day of cultivation in the amount of 1, 5, 10 mg/kg of body weight increased the total protein in blood serum due to the increase in the globulin fraction, which indicates an increase in the protective functions of the body of chicken and is one of reasons for higher livestock safety (P<0.05).

Lithium ascorbate was tested as a cerebroprotective agent in the model of ischemic stroke. The effect of lithium ascorbate was studied on a model of chronic alcohol intoxication, in which deviant behavior of animals is combined with irreversible degenerative changes in the liver and central nervous system (including demyelination of nerves). Lithium ascorbate at doses of 5, 10 and 30 mg/kg normalized behavioral responses in the open field and elevated plus maze tests. An increase in the dose of lithium ascorbate (10 mg/kg, 30 mg/kg) did not lead to a significant improvement in the studied parameters of the condition. Histological analysis showed that the use of lithium ascorbate minimized the level of ischemic damage to neurocytes to the level of a reversible state and contributed to the preservation of the myelin sheaths of nerves.

== Possible antineoplastic effects ==
Studies of the growth dynamics and metastasis of transplantable Lewis lung (LL) carcinoma in F1 (CBA x C57Bl/6j) mice have shown that lithium ascorbate exhibits moderate antitumor effects. Two series of experiments were carried out; the first series compared the effects of different doses of lithium ascorbate (5 and 10 mg/kg), and the second series compared the effects of lithium ascorbate and lithium carbonate when used at the same dose (5 mg/kg). An analysis of the dynamics of the LL tumor growth showed that both lithium salts already 3 days after the start of their use caused moderate (by 10-15%) inhibition of LL growth in tumor-bearing animals. At the same time, the effect of lithium ascorbate was more pronounced and stable: a statistically significant effect of this drug was observed from day 10 and throughout the entire observation period, and the TPO index was at a fairly high level (30-40%). The antitumor effect of lithium carbonate in this experiment was less pronounced (TPO=20-30%).

== Availability in foods and supplements ==
Lithium ascorbate can be found some dietary supplements with varying doses - from 200 mcg/tab up to 5000 mcg/tab of elemental lithium. Attempts are being made to include lithium ascorbate in premixes for animals (in doses of 5–10 mg/kg of body weight) in order to prevent the negative impact of stresses of various etiologies, to increase the intensity of growth and safety of farm animals and poultry.
