= L-galactose 1-dehydrogenase =

Enzyme

Identifiers
- EC no.: 1.1.1.316

Databases
- IntEnz: IntEnz view
- BRENDA: BRENDA entry
- ExPASy: NiceZyme view
- KEGG: KEGG entry
- MetaCyc: metabolic pathway
- PRIAM: profile
- PDB structures: RCSB PDB PDBe PDBsum
Search
- PMC: articles
- PubMed: articles
- NCBI: proteins

L-galactose 1-dehydrogenase (EC 1.1.1.316, L-GalDH, L-galactose dehydrogenase) is an enzyme with the systematic name L-galactose:NAD^{+} 1-oxidoreductase. This enzyme catalyses the following chemical reaction:

L-galactopyranose
+ NAD^{+}
H^{+}
H^{+}
L-galactono-1,4-lactone
+ NADH

The enzyme catalyses a step in the ascorbate biosynthesis in higher plants.
