= D-galactose 1-dehydrogenase =

d-galactose 1-dehydrogenase

Identifiers
- EC no.: 1.1.1.48
- CAS no.: 9028-54-0

Databases
- IntEnz: IntEnz view
- BRENDA: BRENDA entry
- ExPASy: NiceZyme view
- KEGG: KEGG entry
- MetaCyc: metabolic pathway
- PRIAM: profile
- PDB structures: RCSB PDB PDBe PDBsum
- Gene Ontology: AmiGO / QuickGO
Search
- PMC: articles
- PubMed: articles
- NCBI: proteins

In enzymology, a d-galactose 1-dehydrogenase (EC 1.1.1.48) is an enzyme that catalyzes the chemical reaction

D-galactose
+ NAD^{+}
H^{+}
H^{+}
D-galactono-1,4-lactone
+ NADH

The two substrates of this enzyme are D-galactose and oxidised nicotinamide adenine dinucleotide (NAD^{+}). Its products are D-galactono-1,4-lactone, reduced NADH, and a proton.

This enzyme belongs to the family of oxidoreductases, specifically those acting on the CH-OH group of donor with NAD^{+} or NADP^{+} as acceptor. The systematic name of this enzyme class is d-galactose:NAD^{+} 1-oxidoreductase. Other names in common use include d-galactose dehydrogenase, beta-galactose dehydrogenase, and NAD^{+}-dependent d-galactose dehydrogenase. This enzyme participates in galactose metabolism.
