= Glucuronokinase =

Enzymes that calatyses a chemical reaction

Identifiers
- EC no.: 2.7.1.43
- CAS no.: 9026-62-4

Databases
- IntEnz: IntEnz view
- BRENDA: BRENDA entry
- ExPASy: NiceZyme view
- KEGG: KEGG entry
- MetaCyc: metabolic pathway
- PRIAM: profile
- PDB structures: RCSB PDB PDBe PDBsum
- Gene Ontology: AmiGO / QuickGO
Search
- PMC: articles
- PubMed: articles
- NCBI: proteins

Glucuronokinase (EC 2.7.1.43) is an enzyme that catalyzes the chemical reaction

ATP +
D-glucuronic acid
ADP +
1-phospho-α-D-glucuronic acid

The enzyme characterised from mung bean converts D-glucuronic acid to 1-phospho-α-D-glucuronic acid by transferring a phosphate group from the cofactor, adenosine triphosphate (ATP), which is converted to adenosine diphosphate (ADP).

This enzyme is a transferase, specifically one transferring phosphorus-containing groups (phosphotransferases) with an alcohol group as acceptor. The systematic name of this enzyme class is ATP:D-glucuronate 1-phosphotransferase. Other names in common use include glucuronokinase (phosphorylating), and glucurono-glucuronokinase.
