= Sodium ascorbate =

Sodium l-ascorbate
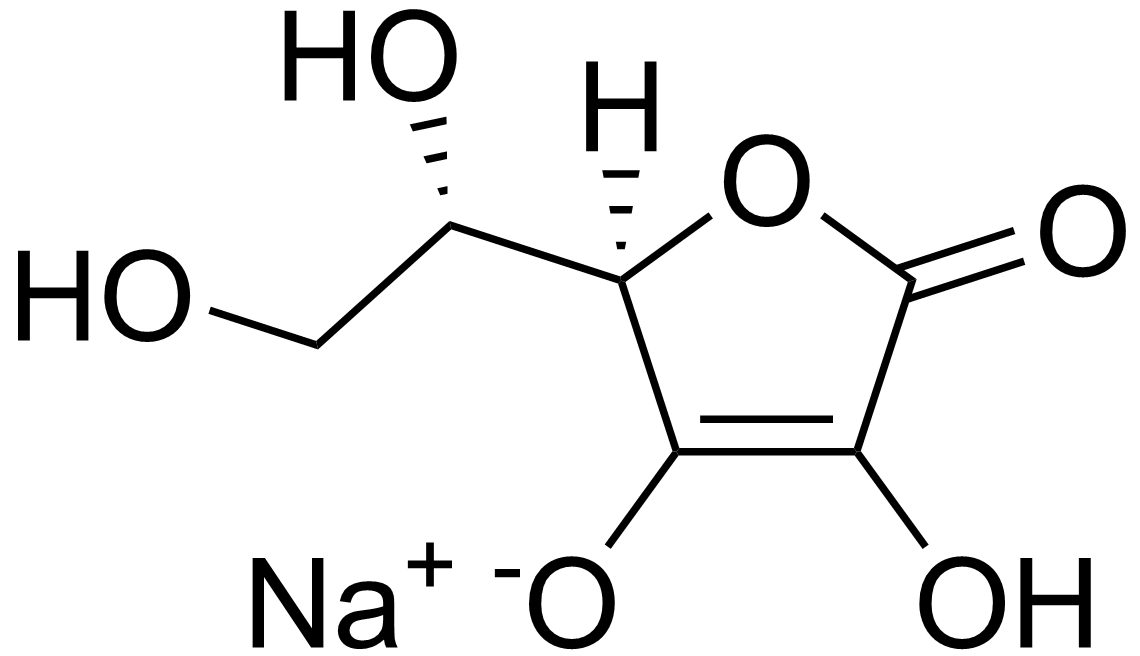

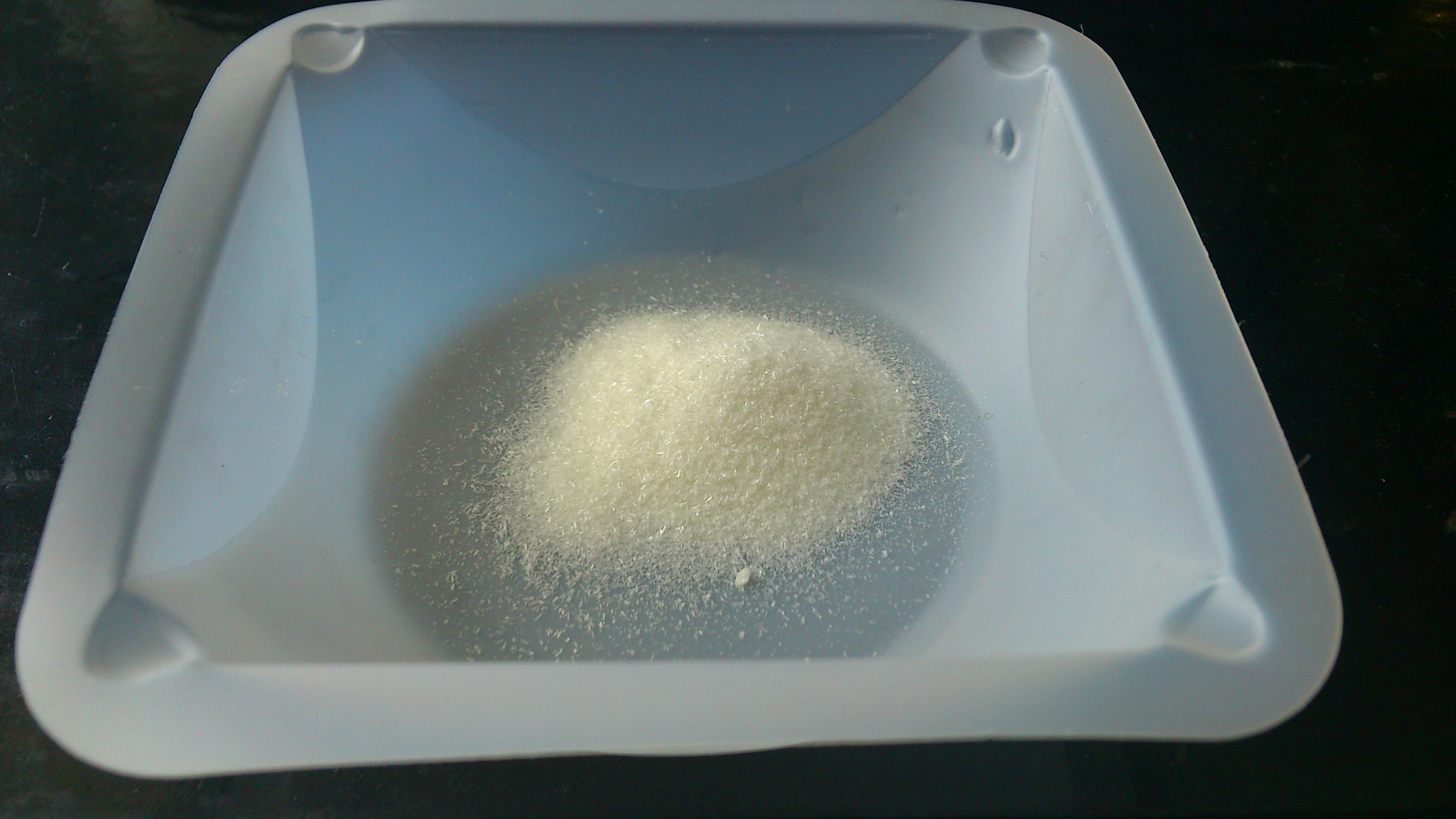

Names
- IUPAC name Sodium (2R)-2-[(1S)-1,2-dihydroxyethyl]-4-hydroxy-5-oxo-2H-furan-3-olate
- Other names Sodascorbate; Monosodium ascorbate; E301

Identifiers
CAS Number	134-03-2
3D model (JSmol)	Interactive image
ChEBI	CHEBI:113451
ChEMBL	ChEMBL591665
ChemSpider	16736174
DrugBank	DB14482
ECHA InfoCard	100.004.661
EC Number	205-126-1
E number	E301 (antioxidants, ...)
KEGG	D05853
PubChem CID	23667548
RTECS number	CI7671000
UNII	S033EH8359
CompTox Dashboard (EPA)	DTXSID0020105
- InChI: Key: PPASLZSBLFJQEF-RXSVEWSESA-M; InChI=1S/C6H8O6.Na/c7-1-2(8)5-3(9)4(10)6(11)12-5;/h2,5,7-10H, 1H2;/q;+1/p-1/t2-,5+;/m0./s1
- SMILES: OC1=C([O-])[C@]([C@@H](O)CO)([H])OC1=O.[Na+]

Properties
Chemical formula	C_{6}H_{7}NaO_{6}
Molar mass	198.106 g·mol^{−1}
Appearance	minute white to yellow crystals
Odor	odorless
Density	1.66 g/cm^{3}
Melting point	218 °C (424 °F; 491 K) (decomposes)
Solubility in water	62 g/100 mL (25 °C); 78 g/100 mL (75 °C)
Solubility	very slightly soluble in alcohol insoluble in chloroform, ether

Hazards
NFPA 704 (fire diamond)	0 0 0
- Except where otherwise noted, data are given for materials in their standard state (at 25 °C [77 °F], 100 kPa). verify (what is ?) Infobox references

Sodium ascorbate is one of a number of mineral salts of ascorbic acid (vitamin C). The molecular formula of this chemical compound is C_{6}H_{7}NaO_{6}. As the sodium salt of ascorbic acid, it is known as a mineral ascorbate. It has not been demonstrated to be more bioavailable than any other form of vitamin C supplement.

Sodium ascorbate normally provides 131 mg of sodium per 1,000 mg of ascorbic acid (1,000 mg of sodium ascorbate contains 889 mg of ascorbic acid and 111 mg of sodium).

As a food additive, it has the E number E301 and is used as an antioxidant and an acidity regulator. It is approved for use as a food additive in the EU, USA, Australia, and New Zealand.

In in vitro studies, sodium ascorbate has been found to produce cytotoxic effects in various malignant cell lines, which include melanoma cells that are particularly susceptible.

== Production ==
Sodium ascorbate is produced by dissolving ascorbic acid in water and adding an equimolar amount of sodium hydroxide or sodium bicarbonate in water. After cessation of effervescence, the sodium ascorbate is precipitated by the addition of isopropanol.
