= Galactose 1-dehydrogenase (NADP+) =

Enzyme class

galactose 1-dehydrogenase (NADP^{+})

Identifiers
- EC no.: 1.1.1.120
- CAS no.: 37250-51-4

Databases
- IntEnz: IntEnz view
- BRENDA: BRENDA entry
- ExPASy: NiceZyme view
- KEGG: KEGG entry
- MetaCyc: metabolic pathway
- PRIAM: profile
- PDB structures: RCSB PDB PDBe PDBsum
- Gene Ontology: AmiGO / QuickGO
Search
- PMC: articles
- PubMed: articles
- NCBI: proteins

In enzymology, a galactose 1-dehydrogenase (NADP^{+}) (EC 1.1.1.120) is an enzyme that catalyzes the chemical reaction

D-galactose
+ NADP^{+}
H^{+}
H^{+}
D-galactono-1,5-lactone
+ NADPH

Thus, the two substrates of this enzyme are D-galactose (shown in its aldehydo form) and oxidised nicotinamide adenine dinucleotide phosphate (NADP^{+}). Its products are D-galactono-1,5-lactone, reduced NADPH, and a proton.

This enzyme belongs to the family of oxidoreductases, specifically those acting on the CH-OH group of donor with NAD^{+} or NADP^{+} as acceptor. The systematic name of this enzyme class is D-galactose:NADP^{+} 1-oxidoreductase. Other names in common use include D-galactose dehydrogenase (NADP^{+}), and galactose 1-dehydrogenase (NADP^{+}). This enzyme participates in galactose metabolism.
