= Glucuronate reductase =

L-glucuronate reductase

Identifiers
- EC no.: 1.1.1.19
- CAS no.: 9028-29-9

Databases
- BRENDA: enzyme data
- ExPASy: NiceZyme view
- KEGG: enzyme entry
- MetaCyc: metabolic pathway
- Rhea: reactions
- PDB structures: RCSB PDB PDBe PDBsum
- Gene Ontology: AmiGO / QuickGO
Search
- PMC: articles
- PubMed: articles
- NCBI: proteins

Glucuronate reductases (EC 1.1.1.19) are a type of enzyme found in humans (encoded by the gene AKR1A1) and other mammals that catalyze the chemical reaction

L-gulonic acid
+ NADP^{+}
H^{+}
H^{+}
D-glucoronic acid
+ NADPH

The two substrates of this enzyme are L-gulonatic acid and oxidised nicotinamide adenine dinucleotide phosphate (NADP^{+}). Its products are D-glucuronic acid, reduced NADPH, and a proton.

This enzyme belongs to the family of oxidoreductases, specifically those acting on the CH-OH group of donor with NAD^{+} or NADP^{+} as acceptor. The systematic name of this enzyme class is L-gulonate:NADP^{+} 6-oxidoreductase. Other names in common use include aldehyde reductase, L-hexonate:NADP dehydrogenase, TPN-L-gulonate dehydrogenase, aldehyde reductase II, NADP-L-gulonate dehydrogenase, D-glucuronate dehydrogenase, D-glucuronate reductase, and L-glucuronate reductase (incorrect). This enzyme participates in pentose and glucuronate interconversions and ascorbate and aldarate metabolism.
