= Chemistry of ascorbic acid =

l-Ascorbic acid

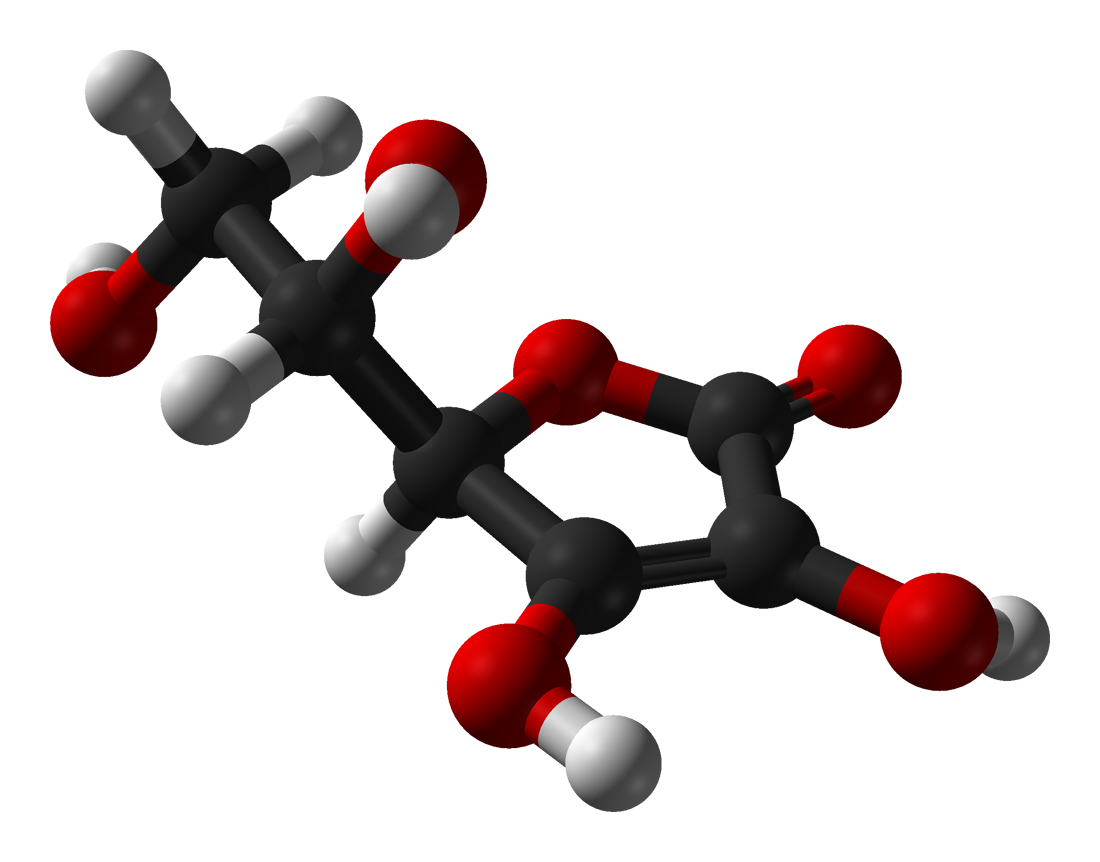

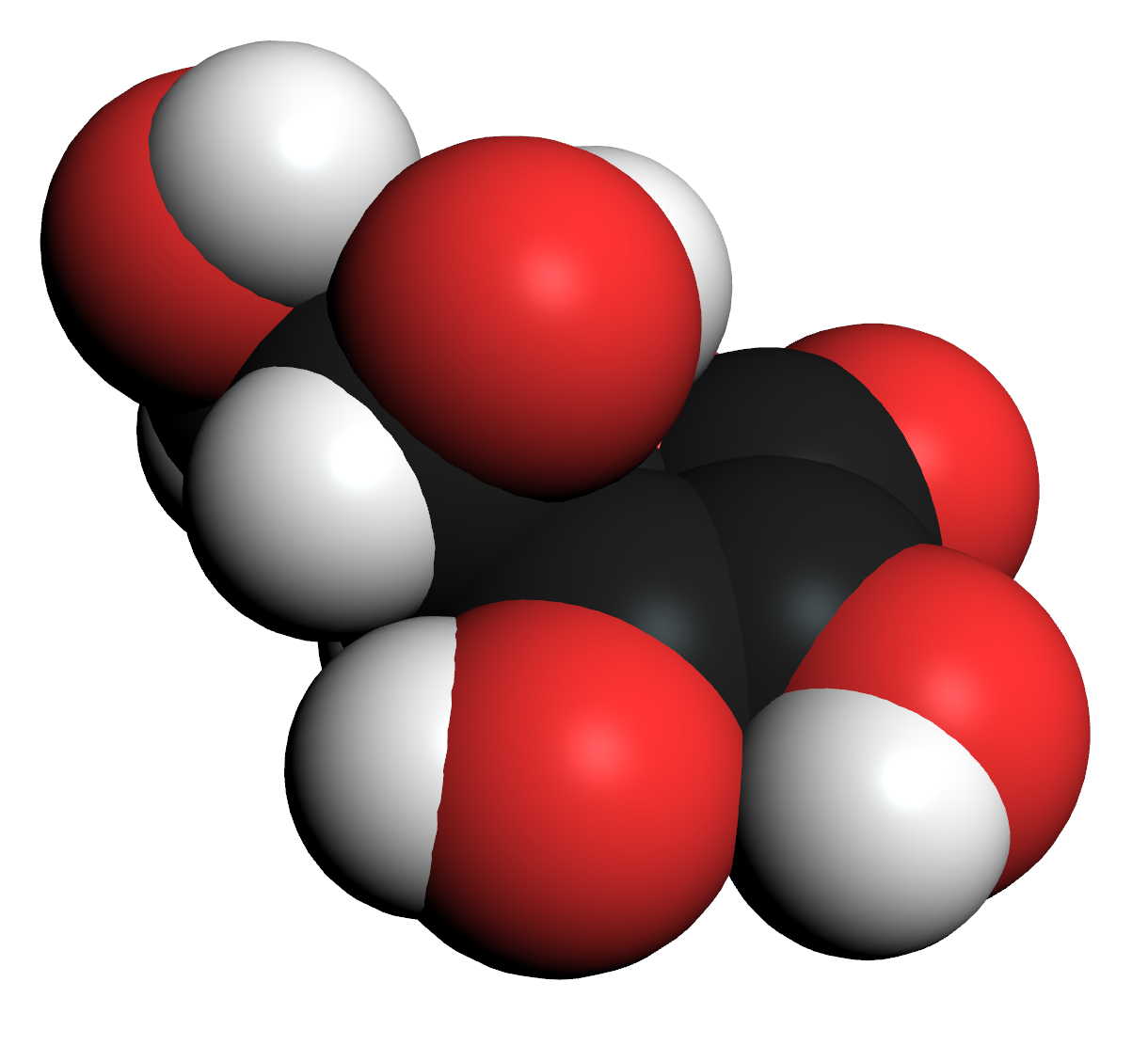

Names
- IUPAC name l-threo-Hex-2-enono-1,4-lactone
- Systematic IUPAC name (5R)-[(1S)-1,2-Dihydroxyethyl]-3,4-dihydroxyfuran-2(5H)-one
- Other names: Vitamin C

Identifiers
CAS Number	50-81-7
3D model (JSmol)	Interactive image; Interactive image
ChEBI	CHEBI:29073
ChEMBL	ChEMBL196
ChemSpider	10189562
EC Number	200-066-2
E number	E300 (antioxidants, ...)
IUPHAR/BPS	4781
KEGG	D00018
PubChem CID	5785
UNII	PQ6CK8PD0R
- InChI: InChI=1S/C6H8O6/c7-1-2(8)5-3(9)4(10)6(11)12-5/h2,5,7-10H,1H2/t2-,5+/m0/s1 Key: CIWBSHSKHKDKBQ-JLAZNSOCSA-N
- SMILES: OC=1C(OC(=O)C=1O)[C@@H](O)CO; C([C@@H]([C@@H]1C(=C(C(=O)O1)O)O)O)O

Properties
Chemical formula	C_{6}H_{8}O_{6}
Molar mass	176.124 g·mol^{−1}
Appearance	White or light yellow solid
Density	1.65 g/cm^{3}
Melting point	190 to 192 °C (374 to 378 °F; 463 to 465 K) decomposes
Solubility in water	330 g/L
Solubility	Insoluble in diethyl ether, chloroform, benzene, petroleum ether, oils, fats
Solubility in ethanol	20 g/L
Solubility in glycerol	10 g/L
Solubility in propylene glycol	50 g/L
Acidity (pK_{a})	4.10 (first), 11.6 (second)

Pharmacology
ATC code	A11GA01 (WHO) G01AD03 (WHO), S01XA15 (WHO)

Hazards
NFPA 704 (fire diamond)	1 1 0
- Lethal dose or concentration (LD, LC)
LD_{50} (median dose)	11.9 g/kg (oral, rat)
Safety data sheet (SDS)	JT Baker
- Except where otherwise noted, data are given for materials in their standard state (at 25 °C [77 °F], 100 kPa). verify (what is ?) Infobox references

Ascorbic acid is an organic compound with the formula C_{6}H_{8}O_{6}, originally called hexuronic acid. It is a white solid, but impure samples can appear yellowish. It dissolves freely in water to give mildly acidic solutions. It is a mild reducing agent.

Ascorbic acid exists as two enantiomers (mirror-image isomers), commonly denoted "l" (for "levo") and "d" (for "dextro"). The l isomer is the one most often encountered: it occurs naturally in many foods, and is one form ("vitamer") of vitamin C, an essential nutrient for humans and many animals. Deficiency of vitamin C causes scurvy, formerly a major disease of sailors in long sea voyages. It is used as a food additive and a dietary supplement for its antioxidant properties. The "d" form (erythorbic acid) can be made by chemical synthesis, but has no major biological role.

== Etymology ==
The term ascorbic means "without scurvy" ("a-" meaning "without" and "scorbutic" meaning "of scurvy") and denotes the ability to fight off scurvy. It is related to combating Vitamin C deficiency.

== History ==
The antiscorbutic properties of certain foods were demonstrated in the 18th century by James Lind. In 1907, Axel Holst and Theodor Frølich discovered that the antiscorbutic factor was a water-soluble chemical substance, distinct from the one that prevented beriberi. Between 1928 and 1932, Albert Szent-Györgyi isolated a candidate for this substance, which he called "hexuronic acid", first from plants and later from animal adrenal glands. In 1932 Charles Glen King confirmed that it was indeed the antiscorbutic factor.

In 1933, sugar chemist Walter Norman Haworth, working with samples of "hexuronic acid" (now called ascorbic acid) that Szent-Györgyi had isolated from paprika and sent him in the previous year, deduced the correct structure and optical-isomeric nature of the compound, and in 1934 reported its first synthesis. In reference to the compound's antiscorbutic properties, Haworth and Szent-Györgyi proposed to rename it "a-scorbic acid" for the compound, and later specifically l-ascorbic acid. Because of their work, in 1937 two Nobel Prizes: in Chemistry and in Physiology or Medicine were awarded to Haworth and Szent-Györgyi, respectively.

== Chemical properties ==
=== Acidity ===
Ascorbic acid is a furan-based lactone of 2-ketogluconic acid. It contains an adjacent enediol adjacent to the carbonyl. This −C(OH)=C(OH)−C(=O)− structural pattern is characteristic of reductones, and increases the acidity of one of the enol hydroxyl groups. The deprotonated conjugate base is the ascorbate anion, which is stabilized by electron delocalization that results from resonance between two forms:

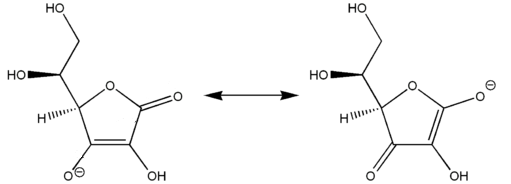

For this reason, ascorbic acid is much more acidic than would be expected if the compound contained only isolated hydroxyl groups.

=== Salts ===
The ascorbate anion forms salts, such as sodium ascorbate, calcium ascorbate, lithium ascorbate, and potassium ascorbate.

=== Esters ===
Ascorbic acid can also react with organic acids as an alcohol forming esters such as ascorbyl palmitate and ascorbyl stearate.

=== Nucleophilic attack ===
Nucleophilic attack of ascorbic acid on a proton results in a 1,3-diketone:

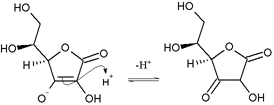

=== Oxidation ===
Semidehydroascorbate acid radical

Pseudodehydroascorbate

Dehydroascorbate

The ascorbate ion is the predominant species at typical biological pH values. It is a mild reducing agent and antioxidant, typically reacting with oxidants of the reactive oxygen species, such as the hydroxyl radical.

Reactive oxygen species are damaging to animals and plants at the molecular level due to their possible interaction with nucleic acids, proteins, and lipids. Sometimes these radicals initiate chain reactions. Ascorbate can terminate these chain radical reactions by electron transfer. The oxidized forms of ascorbate are relatively unreactive and do not cause cellular damage.

Ascorbic acid and its sodium, potassium, and calcium salts are commonly used as antioxidant food additives. These compounds are water-soluble, and thus cannot protect fats from oxidation: for this purpose, the fat-soluble esters of ascorbic acid with long-chain fatty acids (ascorbyl palmitate and ascorbyl stearate) can be used as antioxidant food additives. Sodium-dependent active transport process enables absorption of ascorbic acid from the intestine.

Ascorbate readily donates a hydrogen atom to free radicals, forming the radical anion semidehydroascorbate (also known as monodehydroascorbate), a resonance-stabilized semitrione:

C_{6}H_{7}O^{−}_{6} + L• → C_{6}H_{6}O_{6}^{•}^{−} + LH

Loss of an electron from semidehydroascorbate to produce the 1,2,3-tricarbonyl pseudodehydroascorbate is thermodynamically disfavored, which helps prevent propagation of free radical chain reactions such as autoxidation:

C_{6}H_{6}O_{6}^{•}^{−} + O_{2} $\not\rightarrow$ C_{6}H_{6}O_{6} + O_{2}^{•}^{−}

However, being a good electron donor, excess ascorbate in the presence of free metal ions can not only promote but also initiate free radical reactions, thus making it a potentially dangerous pro-oxidative compound in certain metabolic contexts.

Semidehydroascorbate oxidation instead occurs in conjunction with hydration, yielding the bicyclic hemiketal dehydroascorbate. In particular, semidehydroascorbate undergoes disproportionation to ascorbate and dehydroascorbate:

C_{6}H_{6}O_{6}^{•}^{−} + L• + H_{2}O + H^{+} → C_{6}H_{8}O_{7} + LH
2 C_{6}H_{6}O_{6}^{•}^{−} + H_{2}O + H^{+} → C_{6}H_{8}O_{7} + C_{6}H_{7}O^{−}_{6}

Aqueous solutions of dehydroascorbate are unstable, undergoing hydrolysis with a half-life of 5–15 minutes at 37 °C (99 °F). Decomposition products include diketogulonic acid, xylonic acid, threonic acid and oxalic acid.

=== Other reactions ===
It creates volatile compounds when mixed with glucose and amino acids at 90 °C.

It is a cofactor in tyrosine oxidation, though because a crude extract of animal liver is used, it is unclear which reaction catalyzed by which enzyme is being helped here. For known roles in enzymatic reactions, see Vitamin C § Pharmacodynamics.

Because it reduces iron(III) and chelates iron ions, it enhances the oral absorption of non-heme iron. This property also applies to its enantiomer.

==== Conversion to oxalate ====
In 1958, it was discovered that ascorbic acid can be converted to oxalate, a key component of calcium oxalate kidney stones. The process begins with the formation of dehydroascorbic acid (DHA) from the ascorbyl radical. While DHA can be recycled back to ascorbic acid, a portion irreversibly degrades to 2,3-diketogulonic acid (DKG), which then breaks down to both oxalate and the sugars L-erythrulose and threosone. Research conducted in the 1960s suggested ascorbic acid could substantially contribute to urinary oxalate content (possibly over 40%), but these estimates have been questioned due to methodological limitations. Subsequent large cohort studies have yielded conflicting results regarding the link between vitamin C intake and kidney stone formation. The overall clinical significance of ascorbic acid consumption to kidney stone risk, however, remains inconclusive, although several studies have suggested a potential association, especially with high-dose supplementation in men.

== Uses ==
=== Food additive ===
The main use of l-ascorbic acid and its salts is as food additives, mostly to combat oxidation and prevent discoloration of the product during storage. It is approved for this purpose in the EU with E number E300, the US, Australia, and New Zealand.

The "d" enantiomer (erythorbic acid) shares all of the non-biological chemical properties with the more common l enantiomer. As a result, it is an equally effective food antioxidant, and is also approved in processed foods.

=== Dietary supplement and biological relevance ===
Another major use of l-ascorbic acid is as a dietary supplement. It is on the World Health Organization's List of Essential Medicines. Its deficiency over a prolonged period of time could cause scurvy, which is characterized by fatigue, widespread weakness in connective tissues and capillary fragility. It affects multiple organ systems due to its role in the biochemical reactions of connective tissue synthesis. Ascorbic acid deficiency inhibits the body's ability to synthesize collagen, which results in body deterioration such as producing tender joints, weakness, and ruptured blood vessels.

=== Niche, non-food uses ===
- Ascorbic acid is easily oxidized and so is used as a reductant in photographic developer solutions (among others) and as a preservative.
- In fluorescence microscopy and related fluorescence-based techniques, ascorbic acid can be used as an antioxidant to increase fluorescent signal and chemically retard dye photobleaching.
- It is also commonly used to remove dissolved metal stains, such as iron, from fiberglass swimming pool surfaces.
- In plastic manufacturing, ascorbic acid can be used to assemble molecular chains more quickly and with less waste than traditional synthesis methods.
- Heroin users are known to use ascorbic acid as a means to convert heroin base to a water-soluble salt so that it can be injected.
- As justified by its reaction with iodine, it is used to negate the effects of iodine tablets in water purification. It reacts with the sterilized water, removing the taste, color, and smell of the iodine. This is why it is often sold as a second set of tablets in most sporting goods stores as Potable Aqua-Neutralizing Tablets, along with the potassium iodide tablets.
- Intravenous high-dose ascorbate is being used as a chemotherapeutic and biological response modifying agent. It is undergoing clinical trials.
- It is sometimes used as a urinary acidifier to enhance the antiseptic effect of methenamine.

== Synthesis ==
Natural biosynthesis of vitamin C occurs through various processes in many plants and animals.

=== Industrial preparation ===
The outdated but historically significant industrial synthesis of ascorbic acid from glucose via the Reichstein process

Seventy percent of the world's supply of ascorbic acid is produced in China. Ascorbic acid is prepared in industry from glucose in a method based on the historical Reichstein process. In the first of a five-step process, glucose is catalytically hydrogenated to sorbitol, which is then oxidized by the microorganism Acetobacter suboxydans to sorbose. Only one of the six hydroxy groups is oxidized by this enzymatic reaction. From this point, two routes are available. Treatment of the product with acetone in the presence of an acid catalyst converts four of the remaining hydroxyl groups to acetals. The unprotected hydroxyl group is oxidized to the carboxylic acid by reaction with the catalytic oxidant TEMPO (regenerated by sodium hypochlorite – bleaching solution). Historically, industrial preparation via the Reichstein process used potassium permanganate as the bleaching solution. Acid-catalyzed hydrolysis of this product performs the dual function of removing the two acetal groups and ring-closing lactonization. This step yields ascorbic acid. Each of the five steps has a yield larger than 90%.

A biotechnological process, first developed in China in the 1960s but further developed in the 1990s, bypasses acetone-protecting groups. A second genetically modified microbe species, such as mutant Erwinia, among others, oxidises sorbose into 2-ketogluconic acid (2-KGA), which can then undergo ring-closing lactonization via dehydration. This method is used in the predominant process used by the ascorbic acid industry. Researchers are exploring means for one-step fermentation.

=== Determination ===
The traditional way to analyze the ascorbic acid content is by titration with an oxidizing agent, and several procedures have been developed.

The popular iodometry approach uses iodine in the presence of a starch indicator. Iodine is reduced by ascorbic acid, and when all the ascorbic acid has reacted, the iodine is in excess, forming a blue-black complex with the starch indicator. This indicates the end-point of the titration.

As an alternative, ascorbic acid can be treated with iodine in excess, followed by back titration with sodium thiosulfate using starch as an indicator.

This iodometric method has been revised to exploit the reaction of ascorbic acid with iodate and iodide in acid solution. Electrolyzing the potassium iodide solution produces iodine, which reacts with ascorbic acid. The end of the process is determined by potentiometric titration like Karl Fischer titration. The amount of ascorbic acid can be calculated by Faraday's law.

Another alternative uses N-bromosuccinimide (NBS) as the oxidizing agent in the presence of potassium iodide and starch. The NBS first oxidizes the ascorbic acid; when the latter is exhausted, the NBS liberates the iodine from the potassium iodide, which then forms the blue-black complex with starch.

== See also ==
- Colour retention agent
- Erythorbic acid: a diastereomer of ascorbic acid.
- Mineral ascorbates: salts of ascorbic acid
- Acids in wine
