= Theodor Frølich =

Norwegian physician and professor

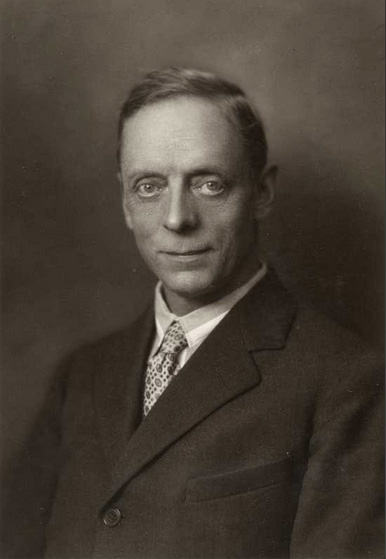
- Theodor Frølich
- Born: 29 September 1870; Kristiania (Oslo), Norway
- Died: 14 August 1947 (aged 76); Oslo, Norway
- Education: University of Oslo
- Known for: Treatment of Beriberi and Scurvy, identification of Vitamin C
- Awards: Legion of Honor, Order of St. Olav
- Scientific career
- Fields: Pediatrics
- Workplaces: University of Oslo

Theodor Christian Brun Frølich (29 September 1870 – 14 August 1947) was a Norwegian physician and Professor of Pediatrics at the University of Oslo. In 1938 he was nominated for the Nobel Prize in Physiology or Medicine for his pioneering contributions to the study of the treatment of Scurvy and to the development of Vitamin C.

== Biography ==
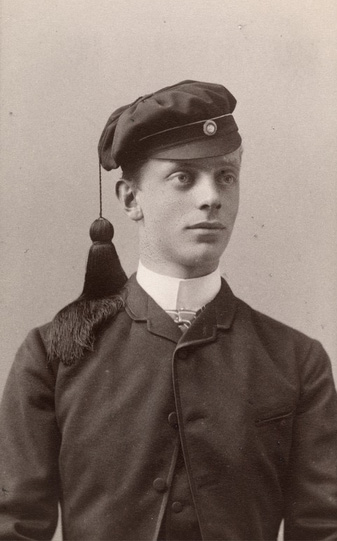
Frølich in 1889, after examen artium

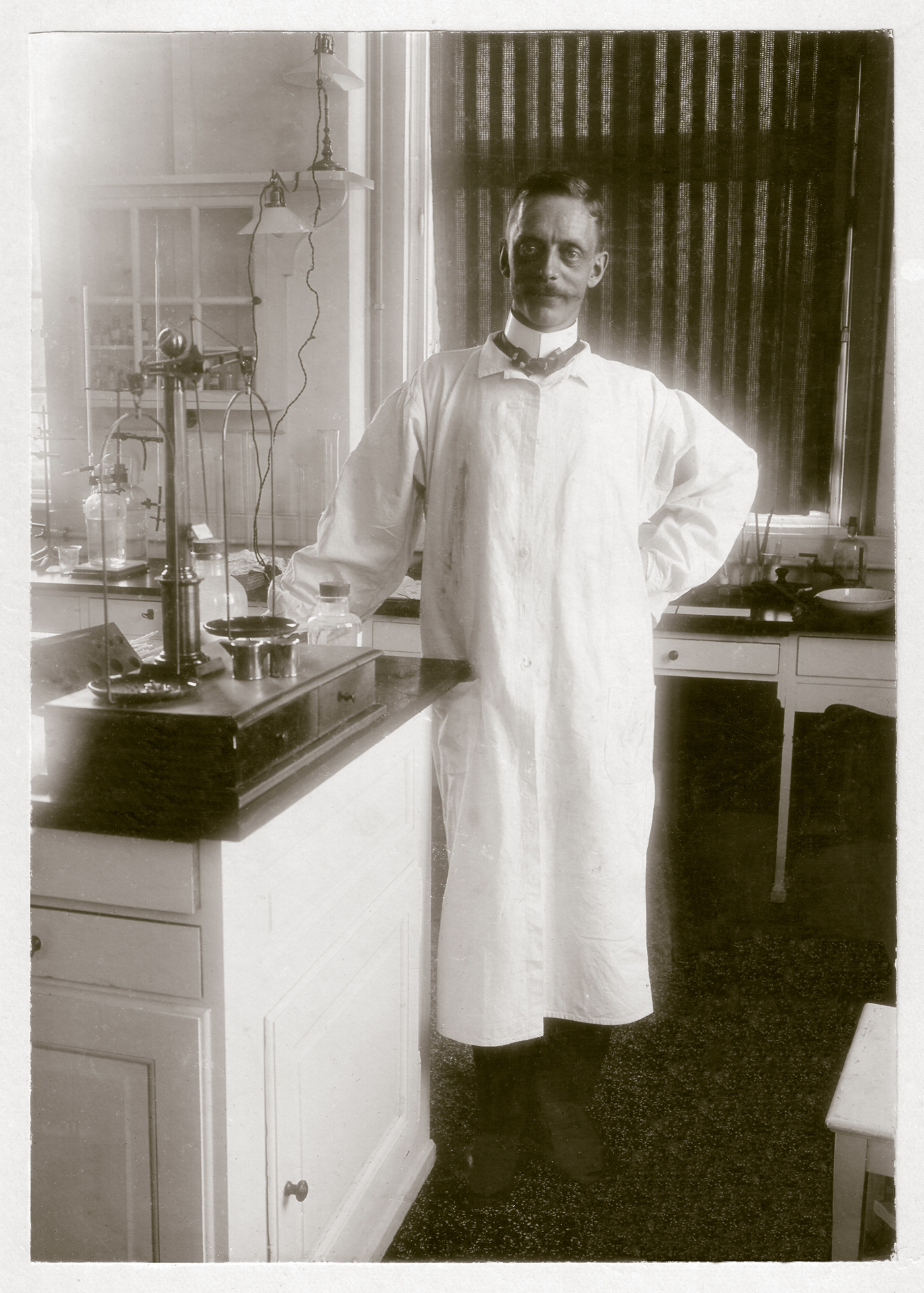
Frølich in the laboratory circa 1910

Theodor Frølich was born in Christiania (now Oslo), Norway. He was the son of Hofmarskalk (Lord Steward of the Household) Theodor Christian Brun Frølich (1834–1904) and Bodil Christina (Stina) Grønn (1834–1901). In 1897 he married (Clara Constance Rosalie) Aimée Thaulow Knutsen (1873–1948). Their son was the fencer Jens Frølich (1914–1938), who competed in the individual and team foil events at the 1936 Summer Olympics. Their grandsons were jazz musicians Theodor Christian Frølich «Totti» Bergh (1935–2012) and his brother Johs. Bergh (1932–2001).

=== Early career ===
After examen artium from Gjertsen's Skole (1888) Frølich studied medicine at the University of Oslo and gained the cand.med degree in 1895. He was a general practitioner in Larvik and Sandefjord Spa and returned to Kristiania in 1896 as chief physician at Rikshospitalet, the departement of pediatrics. He did research on diabetes in children, resulting in his doctorate (dr.med) in 1903.

Frølich then joined professor Axel Holst (1860–1931) at the University Institute of Hygiene to study scurvy, suspected of being a nutritional deficiency among fishermen, then called shipboard beri-beri. Holst and Frølich established an animal model that allowed systematic study of factors that led to the ship-related dietary disease, as well as the preventive value of different substances. They discovered that scurvy occurred in guinea pigs when fed solely with various types of grain, either whole or baked into bread, and these symptoms were prevented when the diet was supplemented with known antiscorbutics like fresh cabbage or lemon juice. Frølich published his results in 1910 and 1912 and identified vitamin C before the essential idea of vitamins had been introduced, maybe the single most important piece of vitamin C research.

In 1920 Frølich was appointed Professor of pediatrics at the Oslo University. He engaged in research on tuberculosis, became president of Nasjonalforeningen mot tuberkulosen (the National Society Against Tuberculosis), and initiated the preventive Tuberculin skin test for school children. In Norway Frølich was also renowned for Dr. Frølichs Cough Syrup, a sweetened extract of Carapichea ipecacuanha.

== Honors ==
- 1918–1920 Det norske medicinske Selskab, president
- 1923–1924 Den norske legeforening, president
- 1924 Det Norske Videnskaps-Akademi, member
- 1935 Det Kongelige Norske Videnskabers Selskab, member
- 1928–1937 Nationalforeningen mot tuberkulosen, president
- 1931–1937 Oslo helseråd (Municipal Health Council of Oslo), member
- 1931 Legion of Honour, France, officer
- 1934 Order of St. Olav, Norway, knight
- 1935 Gunnerus Medal, of Det Kongelige Norske Videnskabers Selskab.
- Honorary member of Norsk pediatrisk selskap (The Norwegian Pediatric Society)
- 1933 Doctor honoris causa from Karolinska Institutet, Stockholm

== Books ==
- T. Frølich: Studier over Diabetes mellitus i barnealderen af Theodor Frølich. 1903
- T. Frølich: Experimentelle Untersuchungen über den infantilen Skorbut. In: Z. Hyg. Infektionskrankh. Band 72, 1912, S. 155–182.
- T. Frølich: Pædiatri: en veiledning under studiet av den første barnealders sygdommer. 1924
- T. Frølich: Nordisk Lærebog i Pædiatri Munksgaard, 1945, 892 S.
- T. Frølich: Pædiatri. Steen, 1924
