= Calcium ascorbate =

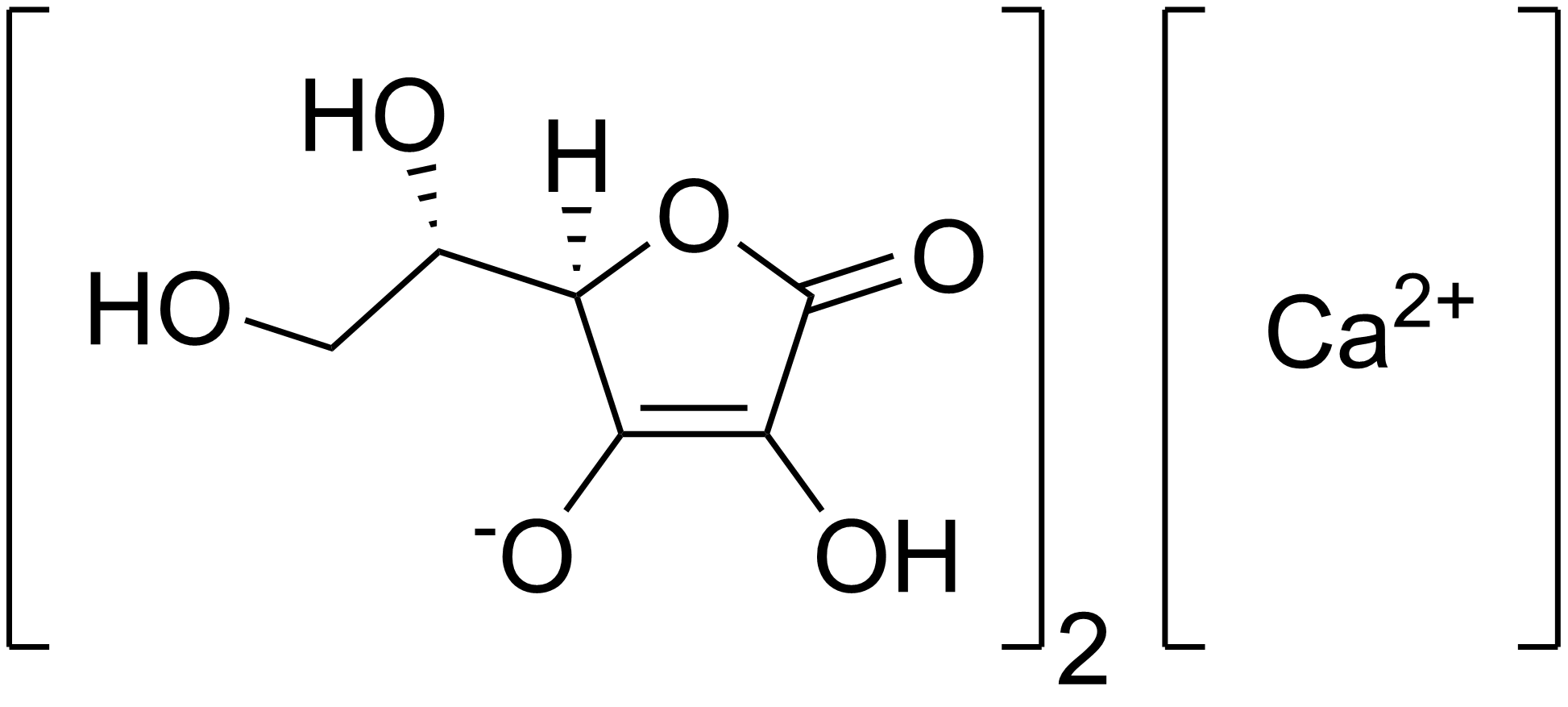

Names
- IUPAC name Calcium (2R)-2-[(1S)-1,2-dihydroxyethyl]-4-hydroxy-5-oxo-2H-furan-3-olate
- Other names Calcium diascorbate; Calcium L-ascorbate; Hemicalcium ascorbate; Calci-C; E 302

Identifiers
CAS Number	5743-27-1
3D model (JSmol)	Interactive image
ChemSpider	4445637
ECHA InfoCard	100.126.521
E number	E302 (antioxidants, ...)
PubChem CID	21967
UNII	J96U0ZD4Y6
CompTox Dashboard (EPA)	DTXSID3047687
- InChI: InChI=1S/2C6H8O6.Ca.2H2O/c2*7-1-2(8)5-3(9)4(10)6(11)12-5;;;/h2*2,5,7-8,10-11H,1H2;;2*1H2/q;;+2;;/p-2/t2*2-,5+;;;/m00.../s1 Key: FWGHSAZDJGAESH-FWCDDDAWSA-L; InChI=1/2C6H8O6.Ca.2H2O/c2*7-1-2(8)5-3(9)4(10)6(11)12-5;;;/h2*2,5,7-8,10-11H,1H2;;2*1H2/q;;+2;;/p-2/t2*2-,5+;;;/m00.../s1 Key: FWGHSAZDJGAESH-ORZGFQGYBD
- SMILES: [Ca+2].O=C1C(\O)=C(\[O-])O[C@@H]1[C@@H](O)CO.O=C1C(\O)=C(\[O-])O[C@@H]1[C@@H](O)CO.O.O

Properties
Chemical formula	Ca(C_{6}H_{7}O_{6})_{2}
Molar mass	390.310 g·mol^{−1}
Solubility in water	About 50 g/100 mL
Solubility	Slightly soluble in alcohol; insoluble in ether
- Except where otherwise noted, data are given for materials in their standard state (at 25 °C [77 °F], 100 kPa). verify (what is ?) Infobox references

Calcium ascorbate is a compound with the molecular formula CaC_{12}H_{14}O_{12}. It is the calcium salt of ascorbic acid, one of the mineral ascorbates. It is approximately 10% calcium by mass.

As a food additive, it has the E number E 302. It is approved for use as a food in the EU, USA and Australia and New Zealand.
