= Patrick Holford =

British author and entrepreneur

Patrick Holford (DOB March 1958) is a British author and entrepreneur who endorses a range of vitamin tablets. As an advocate of alternative nutrition and diet methods, he appears regularly on television and radio in the UK and abroad. He has 36 books in print in 29 languages. His business career promotes a wide variety of alternative medical approaches such as orthomolecular medicine, many of which are considered pseudoscientific by mainstream science and medicine.

Holford's claims about HIV and autism are not in line with modern medical thought and have been criticised for putting people in danger and damaging public health.

In 2006 Holford was discovered to be using his PR adviser to delete critical content from his Wikipedia page.

== Career ==
Holford obtained a BSc in experimental psychology from the University of York in 1979. As a psychology student he became interested in the biochemistry of mental health problems. His research brought him in contact with Carl Pfeiffer and Abram Hoffer, both of whom claimed success in treating mental illness with nutritional therapy.

=== Institute for Optimum Nutrition (ION) ===
In 1984 Holford founded the Institute for Optimum Nutrition (ION). At that institute he has worked on nutritional approaches to clinical depression, schizophrenia, ADHD and eating disorders. In 1995 the Board of Trustees of ION (of which he was a director) awarded him an Honorary Diploma in Nutritional Therapy.

He retired as Director of ION in 1998 and was awarded ION's Award for Excellence in 2009.

He was the chief executive officer and cofounder (with Professor André Tylee of the Institute of Psychiatry) of the special interest group that developed into Food for the Brain Foundation, a registered charity that has the stated aim of promoting mental health through nutrition. He was also director of the Brain Bio Centre, which specialises in a nutrition-based approach to mental health problems.

Holford is a Fellow of the British Association for Nutritional Therapy (BANT), one of a number of professional bodies that seek to represent nutritional therapists in the UK. He is registered with the Complementary and Natural Healthcare Council. He is also the Patron of the South African Association of Nutritional Therapy and the Irish Association of Nutritional Therapy.

Between 2007 and 2008 Holford was a visiting professor at Teesside University and in 2007 was appointed as Head of Science and Education at Biocare, a nutritional supplement company.

Holford has 36 books in print in 29 languages.

== Criticism ==
Holford has been the subject of criticism for his promotion of medically dubious techniques and products including hair analysis, his support of the now struck-off doctor Andrew Wakefield and advocating the use of "non-drug alternatives for mental health", for which he has been given an award by the Church of Scientology-backed Citizens Commission on Human Rights.

In 2006 Patrick Holford was discovered to be using his PR adviser to delete content on his Wikipedia page that was critical of him.

=== HIV ===
Holford's claim in The New Optimum Nutrition Bible that "AZT, the first prescribable anti-HIV drug, is potentially harmful, and proving less effective than vitamin C" has been criticised by Ben Goldacre. Goldacre writes that Holford based this conclusion on a non-clinical study where "you tip lots of vitamin C onto HIV-infected cells and measure a few things related to HIV replication". Goldacre notes that the paper does not compare vitamin C to AZT for efficacy. He argues that "Holford was guilty of at least incompetence in claiming that this study demonstrated vitamin C to be a better treatment than AZT." Prof David Colquhoun argues that Holford's "advocacy of vitamin C as better than conventional drugs to treat Aids is truly scary".

Holford replied to The Guardian newspaper that:

"As [Goldacre] well knows, the author of the research – Dr Raxit Jariwalla – wrote to the Guardian (January 20, 2005) the last time Goldacre made this claim, to confirm that my statement is correct on the basis of two [non-clinical] studies on HIV-infected cells. The real crime here is that no full-scale human trials have been funded on vitamin C to follow up Jariwalla's important finding because it is non-patentable and hence not profitable. Goldacre seems unconcerned about the way commercial interests distort scientific research."

Goldacre replied that Raxit Jariwalla was a senior researcher at the Rath Research Institute in California – connected to vitamin salesman Matthias Rath. Matthias Rath has been linked to the previous policy of the South African government to deny anti-viral drugs to HIV positive patients.

=== Autism ===
Holford believes that there is a potential link in some susceptible children between the MMR vaccine and the development of autism-like symptoms. This is against the overwhelming consensus of the scientific community and many high-quality empirical studies that demonstrate there is no such link. The Wakefield et al. paper upon which this hypothesis was based has been discredited by the scientific community and was retracted from the journal, and 10 of the 12 co-authors have formally disavowed the paper's conclusions. Furthermore, Centers for Disease Control and Prevention, the Institute of Medicine of the National Academy of Sciences, the UK National Health Service and the Cochrane Library review have all concluded that there is no evidence of a link between the MMR vaccine and autism. (See MMR vaccine controversy)

The Cochrane Library's systematic review also concluded that "The design and reporting of safety outcomes in MMR vaccine studies, both pre- and post- marketing, are largely inadequate...." Nonetheless, it noted that the vaccine has prevented diseases that still carry a heavy burden of death and complications, and that the lack of confidence in the vaccine has damaged public health.

Catherine Collins, chief dietician at St George's Hospital, reported that after following Holford's advice to adopt a restricted diet a young autistic girl participating in one of Holford's experiments suffered dramatic weight loss and sleep problems. Holford dismissed the allegations as "professional jealousy", stating that "This girl hasn't suffered. She's got better and is behaving better. Her parents are delighted with the results. It's only Catherine Collins who is not." Holford claimed that the girl was already a poor sleeper and that when placed on a less restrictive diet she was able to regain the weight she had lost.

== Advertising ==
There has also been an adjudication by the Advertising Standards Authority against Patrick Holford's 100% Health leaflet. "On this point, the ad breached CAP Code clauses 3.1 (Substantiation), 7.1 (Truthfulness), 50.1 (Health & beauty products and therapies – General) and 50.20 (Health & beauty products and therapies – Vitamins, minerals and other food supplements)." A previous adjudication by the ASA also went against Mr Holford. . Mr Holford has also been the subject of at least two adverse rulings by the Advertising Standards Authority of South Africa.

== Books ==
- The Family Nutrition Workbook (1988)
- The Whole Health Manual: Comprehensive Guide to Nutrition and Better Health (1988)
- The Better Pregnancy Diet: The Definitive Guide to Having a Healthy Baby (1993)
- The Optimum Nutrition Bible (1997)
- Say No to Heart Disease (updated 2012)
- Boost Your Immune System (1998)
- Balancing Hormones Naturally (1998)
- 30-Day Fatburner Diet (1999)
- 100% Health (1999)
- Beat Stress and Fatigue (1999)
- Say No to Cancer (1999)
- The Optimum Nutrition Cookbook (1999)
- Improve Your Digestion (2000)
- Say No to Arthritis (2000)
- Supplements for Superhealth (2000)
- Solve Your Skin Problems (2001)
- Six Weeks to Superhealth (2002)
- Optimum Nutrition for the Mind (2002)
- Natural Highs: Chill – 25 Ways to Stay Relaxed and Beat Stress (2003)
- Natural Highs: Energy – 25 Ways to Increase Your Energy (2003)
- The H Factor – Homocysteine – the biggest breakthrough of the century (2003)
- Boost Your Child's Immune System (2003)
- 500 Health and Nutrition Questions Answered (2004)
- New Optimum Nutrition Bible (2004)
- Optimum Nutrition Before, During and After Pregnancy (2004)
- The Alzheimer's Prevention Plan (2005)
- The Holford Low-GL Diet (2005)
- The Holford Low-GL Diet Cookbook (2005)
- Hidden Food Allergies (2005)
- The Holford Diet GL Counter (2006)
- The Holford Low-GL Diet Made Easy (2006)
- Optimum Nutrition For Your Child's Mind (2006)
- Food is Better Medicine Than Drugs (2006)
- Smart Food for Smart Kids (2007)
- New Optimum Nutrition for the Mind (2007)
- The Holford 9-Day Liver Detox (2007)
- Optimum Nutrition Made Easy: How to Achieve Optimum Health (2008)
- Optimum Nutrition For Your Child (2008)
- How to Quit without Feeling S**t: The Fast, Highly Effective Way to End Addiction to Caffeine, Sugar, Cigarettes, Alcohol, Illicit or Prescription Drugs (2008)
- Food Glorious Food: Incredibly Delicious Low-GL Recipes for Friends and Family (2008)
- The Low-GL Diet Bible by Patrick Holford (2009)
- The 10 Secrets of 100% Healthy People (2009)
- The Perfect Pregnancy Cookbook (2010)
- 100% Health Survey (2010)
- The Optimum Nutrition Cookbook (2010)
- The Feel Good Factor (2010)
- Say no to Diabetes (2011)
- 10 Secrets of Healthy Ageing (2012)
- 10 Secrets of 100% Health Cookbook (2012)
- Burn Fat Fast (2013)
- The Stress Cure (2015)
