= Harold D. Foster =

Canadian geographer and geomorphologist (1943–2009)

Harold Douglas Foster
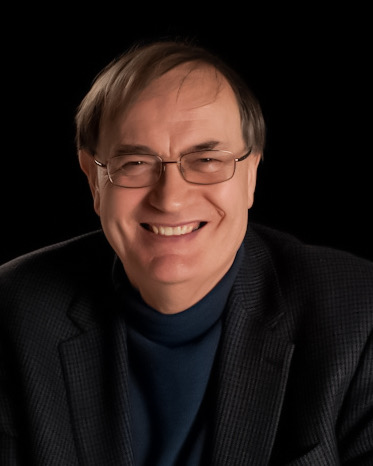
- Harold D. Foster in 2009
- Born: January 9, 1943; Tunstall, North Yorkshire, United Kingdom
- Died: August 15, 2009 (aged 66); Victoria, British Columbia, Canada
- Citizenship: Canadian
- Board member of: Journal of Orthomolecular Medicine

Academic background
- Education: PhD, Geography, University College London
- Thesis: The glaciation of the Harlech Dome (1968)

Academic work
- Discipline: Medical geography
- Sub-discipline: Geomorphology, Disaster planning
- Institutions: University of Victoria
- Main interests: Orthomolecular medicine, medical geography, disaster planning
- Notable works: Disaster planning: the preservation of life and property (1980)
- Notable ideas: “Foster scale” (1976), AIDS nutritional deficiency theory (2000)

Harold D. Foster (January 9, 1943 – August 15, 2009) was a Canadian geographer and geomorphologist. He was a faculty member in the Department of Geography at the University of Victoria from 1967 to 2008. Foster authored or edited over 400 publications on disaster planning and medical geography.

== Early years ==
Foster was born in Tunstall, North Yorkshire, England on January 9, 1943 to Alison and Arthur Foster. He studied at the Hull Grammar School and University College London, where he received his BS in 1964 and PhD in 1968.

== Scientific career ==
Foster has spent 41 years with the University of Victoria, having joined the Department of Geography as an instructor in 1967, becoming assistant professor in 1968, associate professor in 1972 and professor emeritus after his retirement in 2008. Over the years he authored or edited over 400 publications, mainly focusing on reducing disaster losses, identifying causes of chronic diseases, and ecology.

In March 1969, he was elected president of the western division, Canadian Association of Geographers. In April the same year he started a project named “the idea bank”, sending 25,000 questionnaires to politicians and ordinary people. Inspired by the ideas of Marshall McLuhan, he aimed to capture as many ideas as possible and create a computer bank of ideas on various subjects. Foster also established a round-the-clock phone line for recording ideas and saving them to the computer. However, in March 1971 he had to end the project, having run out of money with just 1,000 ideas captured.

In 1976, in an article published at The Professional Geographer he introduced what became known as a “Foster scale” for accessing disaster magnitude in terms of human suffering.

In 1980, Foster published Disaster planning: the preservation of life and property, a classic book on disaster planning, that has been republished 18 times. In this book, he explained the disaster plan preparation process and highlighted that such plans should be prepared before disaster strikes.

In 1981, Foster and W.R. Derrick Sewell co-authored Water: The Emerging Crisis in Canada, a book that suggested that the apparent abundance of water resources in Canada was a myth. The book was an early warning of a growing threat to water resources from pollution. The authors predicted that Canada would face a major water supply crisis within the next 20 years. Foster was also one of the early proponents of energy efficiency.

In 1986, Forster published Reducing cancer mortality: a geographical perspective, a book where he stated cancer mortality is significantly impacted by one's environment. Foster studied the data from a US National Cancer Institute, ran this information through the computer and made a statistical analysis, exploring possible links between cancer and the environment. He concluded, for example, that selenium appears to play a protective role against many specific cancers.

Over the years the focus of his work shifted from geography and disaster planning to medical geography: Foster did extensive international research on the causes of schizophrenia, Alzheimer's, AIDS, cancer and other diseases.

In 1993, in an article published at the Journal of the National Cancer Institute linked road salt-related water pollution to cancer. In 2000, he published a research exploring this subject further. He compared the map of cancer rates in different regions of the United States and Canada with the presence of 219 different substances in the environment and found the closest correlation with road salt. Foster also estimated that road salt causes between C$3.5 and C$7 billion of damage to infrastructures and vehicles every year.

In 2000, Foster came up with the theory that explained the link between selenium deficiency and AIDS. He was among the first scientists to explain how the HIV virus encodes for the entire enzyme called glutathione peroxidase. He argued that when a selenium deficient person is exposed to HIV it enables the virus to persist and gradually deplete their body of the necessary nutrients that produce Glutathione Peroxidase. As it replicates, therefore, it depletes its host not only of selenium but also of the other three components of this enzyme: namely, cysteine, glutamine, and tryptophan. According to Foster, AIDS, therefore, is a nutritional deficiency illness caused by a virus. His later research was focused on selenium content of soils in Africa and the correlation with HIV/AIDS.

In May 2004, Foster was presented with the “Orthomolecular Doctor of the Year” award from the International Society for Orthomolecular Medicine. In 2010, International Society for Orthomolecular Medicine posthumously included Forster to its Hall of Fame.

== Death ==
Foster died of cancer at Victoria Hospice on August 15, 2009.

== Legacy ==
Further research confirmed some of Foster's concepts. In 2006, Mengo Hospital in Uganda completed a 1-year clinical trial (double-blinded) on Dr. Foster's formula on immunocompromised patients. The results were statistically relevant and showed that a micro-nutrient formula could slow the progression of HIV to AIDS. A study based on Botswana data and published in 2013 in the Journal of the American Medical Association also concluded that a multivitamin composition that includes selenium can slow the progression of HIV and reduce the risk of HIV-related death. There are a number of companies including Doctors Choice (Africa) and DoctorFosters.com (Europe/North America) that offer natural food supplements based on Foster's formulas.

== Selected publications ==
- Foster, Harold D. (1970). "Establishing the Age and Geomorphological Significance of Sorted Stone-Stripes in the Rhinog Mountains, North Wales". Geografiska Annaler. 52 (2): 96–102. doi:10.2307/520602. JSTOR 520602.
- Foster, Harold D. (1976). "Assessing Disaster Magnitude: A Social Science Approach". The Professional Geographer. 28 (3): 241–247. doi:10.1111/j.0033-0124.1976.00241.x.
- Foster, Harold D. (1990). "Schizophrenia and Esophageal Cancer: Comments on Similarities in their Spatial Distributions". Journal of Orthomolecular Medicine. 5 (3): 129–134. CiteSeerX 10.1.1.612.1951.
- Foster, Harold D. (1993). "Resilience Theory and System Evaluation". Verification and Validation of Complex Systems: Human Factors Issues. Springer. pp. 35–60. doi:10.1007/978-3-662-02933-6_2. ISBN 978-3-662-02933-6.
- Foster, Harold D.; Zhang, Liping (1995-08-18). "Longevity and selenium deficiency: evidence from the People's Republic of China". Science of the Total Environment. 170 (1–2): 133–139. Bibcode:1995ScTEn.170..133F. doi:10.1016/0048-9697(95)04626-C. PMID 7569876.
- Foster, Harold D. (2004). "How HIV-1 causes AIDS: implications for prevention and treatment". Medical Hypotheses. 62 (4): 549–553. doi:10.1016/j.mehy.2003.12.009. PMID 15050105.
- Bradfield, Marnie; Foster, Harold D. (2006). "The Successful Orthomolecular Treatment of AIDS: Accumulating Evidence from Africa". Journal of Orthomolecular Medicine. 21 (4): 193–196. CiteSeerX 10.1.1.693.756.

== Selected books ==
- Foster, Harold D. (1980). Disaster planning: the preservation of life and property. Springer Series on Environmental Management. New York: Springer-Verlag. doi:10.1007/978-1-4612-6093-6. ISBN 978-1-4612-6095-0.
- Foster, Harold D.; Sewell, W.R. Derrick (1981). Water: The Emerging Crisis in Canada. Toronto: James Lorimer Limited, Publishers. ISBN 0888624476. OCLC 8113804.
- Foster, Harold D. (1986). Reducing cancer mortality: a geographical perspective. University of Victoria. ISBN 0919838138. OCLC 13841198.
- Foster, Harold D. (1992). Health, disease & the environment. London: Belhaven Press. ISBN 0849377374.
- Foster, Harold D.; Lai, Chuenyan David; Zhou, Naisheng (1998). The dragon's head: Shanghai, China's emerging megacity. Western Geographical Press. ISBN 0919838243. OCLC 38990991.
- Foster, Harold D. (2002). What Really Causes AIDS. Trafford Publishing. ISBN 9781553691327.

== Bibliography ==
- American Men & Women of Science. Bowker. 2009. p. 1350. ISBN 9781414433028.
- "Foster, Harold Douglas". Canadian Who's Who. Vol. 43. University of Toronto Press. 2008. p. 434. ISBN 978-0-8020-4071-8 – via Internet Archive.
