= Orthomolecular psychiatry =

Form of alternative medicine

Orthomolecular psychiatry is the use of orthomolecular medicine for mental illness. Orthomolecular psychiatry has been rejected by evidence-based medicine and has been called quackery. The approach uses unorthodox forms of individualized testing and diagnosis to attempt to establish an etiology for each patient's specific symptoms, and claims to tailor the treatment accordingly, using a combination of nutrients, dietary changes and medications that are claimed to enhance quality of life and functionality as well as to reduce or eliminate symptoms and the use of xenobiotic drugs. Scientific studies have shown mixed results; although there are some promising results from nutritional psychiatry, some forms of orthomolecular psychiatry are ineffective.

== History ==
Orthomolecular psychiatry began with Abram Hoffer and Humphry Osmond in the 1950s and was continued by Carl Pfeiffer, although proponents of orthomolecular psychiatry say that the ideas behind their approach can be traced back to the 1920s and '30s. Orthomolecular psychiatry's goal of weaning patients from conventional neuroleptic drugs follows "Pfeiffer's Law", "For every drug that benefits a patient, there is a natural substance that can achieve the same effect". In 1968, Linus Pauling first used the term orthomolecular.

Hoffer's therapies focused on using niacin, among other nutrients, to treat what he diagnosed as acute schizophrenia based on an unaccepted test. In 1973, a task force of the American Psychiatric Association examined niacin monotherapy of patient populations with chronic schizophrenia and bipolar disorder and rejected the practice along with the reliability of Hoffer's diagnostic approach.

The assertions by proponents of orthomolecular psychiatry were rejected in 1973 by a panel of the American Psychiatric Association. However, the underpinning ideas of orthomolecular psychiatry have become popular in alternative medical circles as a means to explain conditions such as autism, heavy metal toxicity, and chronic inflammatory disease. After 1975, orthomolecular psychiatry research was primarily reported in Orthomolecular Psychiatry, now the Journal of Orthomolecular Medicine, a publication founded by Hoffer to counter what he considered to be a medical conspiracy against his ideas.

== Diagnosis ==
Proponents of orthomolecular psychiatry claim to have identified the causes of some psychiatric syndromes, in particular those that cause psychosis; according to orthomolecular proponents, testing for these causes guides diagnosis and treatment. Diagnostic measures and therapies commonly employed include "individual biochemical workup", fasting, identifying suggested allergies, dietary changes, megavitamin therapy, amino acids, and other so-called "pharmacologic nutrients". These diagnoses have not been accepted by mainstream medicine.

== Specific conditions ==
Orthomolecularists claim that the causes of psychotic disorders include food allergy, hypoglycemia, hypothyroidism in the presence of normal thyroid values, heavy metal intoxications including those allegedly due to dental fillings, as well as several hypothesised conditions they call pyroluria, histadelia and histapenia.

=== Pyroluria ===
Pyroluria (or malvaria from the term mauve factor) involves hypothetical excessive levels of pyrroles in the body resulting from improper hemoglobin synthesis. Carl Pfeiffer believed that pyroluria is a form of schizophrenic porphyria, similar to acute intermittent porphyria where both pyrroles and porphyrins are excreted in the human urine to an excessive degree. and orthomolecular psychiatrists have alleged that pyroluria is related to diagnoses of ADHD, alcoholism, autism, depression, down syndrome, manic-depression, schizophrenia, celiac disease, epilepsy, and psychosis. Pfeiffer's methods have not been rigorously tested, and pyrroles are not considered to be related to schizophrenia. Studies have either failed to detect hemopyrrole and kryptopyrrole in the urine of normal controls and schizophrenics, or found no correlation between these chemicals and mental illness. Few, if any, medical experts regard the condition as genuine, and few or no articles on pyroluria are found in modern medical literature; the approach is described as "snake oil" by pediatrician and author Julian Haber.

=== Histadelia ===
Histadelia is a condition hypothesised by Carl Pfeiffer to involve elevated serum levels of histamine and basophils, which he says can be treated with methionine and vitamin B_{6} megadoses. Pfeiffer claims that "histadelia" can cause depression with or without psychosis, but no published clinical trials have tested the effectiveness of this therapy.

=== Histapenia ===
Histapenia in orthomolecular medicine is the condition of high serum copper with low histamine.

== Relationship to mainstream psychiatry ==
Orthomolecular psychiatry has been rejected by the mainstream medical community. Critics have noted that the claims advanced by its proponents are unsubstantiated, and even false. Authoritative bodies such as the National Institute of Mental Health and American Academy of Pediatrics have criticized orthomolecular treatments as ineffective and toxic.

A 1973 task force of the American Psychiatric Association charged with investigating orthomolecular claims concluded:

This review and critique has carefully examined the literature produced by megavitamin proponents and by those who have attempted to replicate their basic and clinical work. It concludes in this regard that the credibility of the megavitamin proponents is low. Their credibility is further diminished by a consistent refusal over the past decade to perform controlled experiments and to report their new results in a scientifically acceptable fashion. Under these circumstances this Task Force considers the massive publicity which they promulgate via radio, the lay press and popular books, using catch phrases which are really misnomers like "megavitamin therapy" and "orthomolecular treatment," to be deplorable.

== Bibliography ==
- Braverman, Eric R; Pfeiffer, Carl Curt; Blum, Kenneth; Smayda, Richard (2003). The healing nutrients within: facts, findings, and new research on amino acids (3rd ed.). North Bergen, New Jersey: Basic Health. ISBN 978-1-59120-037-6.
- Pauling, Linus; Hawkins, D. (1973). Orthomolecular psychiatry: treatment of schizophrenia. San Francisco: W.H. Freeman. p. 697. ISBN 978-0-7167-0898-8.
- Pfeiffer, Carl J (1987). Nutrition and mental illness: An orthomolecular approach to balancing body chemistry. Healing Arts. ISBN 978-0-89281-226-4.
- Werbach, Melvyn R (1999). Nutritional influences on mental illness: a sourcebook of clinical research. Tarzana, California: Third Line. ISBN 978-0-9618550-8-6.
