= Adrenolutin =

Names
- IUPAC name 1-methylindole-3,5,6-triol
- Other names 3,5,6-Trihydroxy-1-methylindole; 1-Methyl-3,5,6-trihydroxyindole

Identifiers
CAS Number	642-75-1
3D model (JSmol)	Interactive image
ChemSpider	8373441
PubChem CID	10197941
UNII	0E3D10P8H9
- InChI: InChI=1S/C9H9NO3/c1-10-4-9(13)5-2-7(11)8(12)3-6(5)10/h2-4,11-13H,1H3 Key: DINWCUSJIVPQIO-UHFFFAOYSA-N
- SMILES: CN1C=C(C2=CC(=C(C=C21)O)O)O

Properties
Chemical formula	C_{9}H_{9}NO_{3}
Molar mass	179.175 g·mol^{−1}
- Except where otherwise noted, data are given for materials in their standard state (at 25 °C [77 °F], 100 kPa). Infobox references

Adrenolutin, also known as 3,5,6-trihydroxy-1-methylindole, is a cyclized derivative of epinephrine (adrenaline) and claimed hallucinogen related to adrenochrome. Along with adrenochrome, adrenolutin is described as an oxidation product of epinephrine. In terms of physical appearance, adrenolutin is described as colorless and as intensely yellow-green fluorescent. It is said to be chemically unstable, albeit considerably more stable than adrenochrome.

Adrenochrome and adrenolutin were studied by Abram Hoffer and Humphry Osmond in the 1950s and 1960s. Based on structural similarity of epinephrine and mescaline, adrenochrome was proposed by these authors as an endogenous psychotomimetic or hallucinogen, metabolite of epinephrine, and mediator in the etiology of schizophrenia. Adrenolutin is an analogue of adrenochrome that was claimed to have similar effects. The compound was said to produce psychological changes at oral doses of 25 to 50 mg in humans. It was said to be as active as adrenochrome but to produce fewer perceptual effects and to have a longer duration or time to recovery. Adrenolutin's effects were said to include thought disorder, decreased anxiety, reduced insight into these changes, affective disharmony, and subtle physical changes. The thought disorder symptoms were said to include decreased abstraction ability, problem-solving difficulty, mood changes, and resemblance to the thought disorder in schizophrenia but without the associated perceptual changes. Adrenolutin was also said to potentiate the effects of LSD and vice versa.

However, the purity of the adrenochrome and adrenolutin used in Hoffer and Osmond's studies was questionable, and further studies were said to be needed to confirm the possible hallucinogenic effects of the compound. Subsequent studies by other researchers with pure material were unable to reproduce the earlier findings, and efforts to detect adrenochrome in people with schizophrenia were unsuccessful. According to Alexander Shulgin in his 1991 book PiHKAL, the notion that adrenochrome and adrenolutin are hallucinogenic is controversial and is not accepted by the scientific community. Following Hoffer and Osmond's investigations of the compounds, interest in adrenochrome and adrenolutin died away and they are now considered to be little more than an interesting historical footnote. John Smythies, a former collaborator of Hoffer and Osmond, continued to stand by and promote the adrenochrome hypothesis of schizophrenia as late as the early 2000s. The history of the theory was critically reviewed and discussed in 2010.
