= Adrenochrome =

Chemical compound

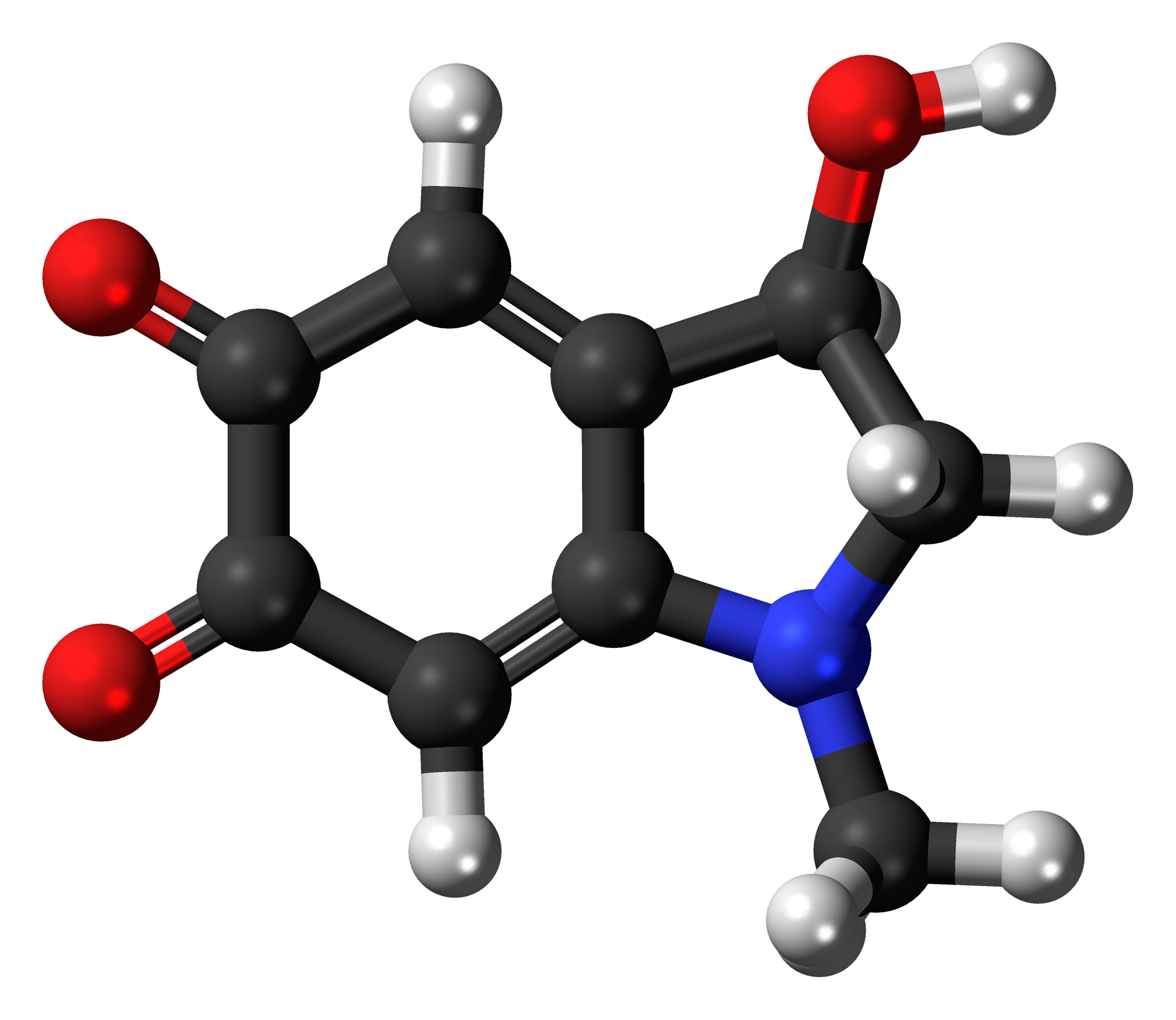

Names
- IUPAC name 3-Hydroxy-1-methyl-2,3-dihydro-1H-indole-5,6-dione
- Other names Adraxone; Pink adrenaline

Identifiers
CAS Number	(racemic): 54-06-8; (R)-Enantiomer: 7506-92-5; (S)-Enantiomer: 5181-82-8
3D model (JSmol)	(racemic): Interactive image
ChEBI	(racemic): CHEBI:166544
ChEMBL	(racemic): ChEMBL1314174
ChemSpider	(racemic): 5687
ECHA InfoCard	100.000.176
EC Number	(racemic): 200-192-8
PubChem CID	(racemic): 5898
UNII	(racemic): 70G54NQL71
CompTox Dashboard (EPA)	(racemic): DTXSID00871530
- InChI: InChI=1S/C9H9NO3/c1-10-4-9(13)5-2-7(11)8(12)3-6(5)10/h2-3,9,13H,4H2,1H3 Key: RPHLQSHHTJORHI-UHFFFAOYSA-N; (racemic): InChI=1/C9H9NO3/c1-10-4-9(13)5-2-7(11)8(12)3-6(5)10/h2-3,9,13H,4H2,1H3 Key: RPHLQSHHTJORHI-UHFFFAOYAD
- SMILES: (racemic): O=C1\C=C2/C(=C\C1=O)N(CC2O)C

Properties
Chemical formula	C_{9}H_{9}NO_{3}
Molar mass	179.175 g·mol^{−1}
Appearance	deep-violet
Density	3.785 g/cm^{3}
Boiling point	115–120 °C (239–248 °F; 388–393 K) (decomposes)
- Except where otherwise noted, data are given for materials in their standard state (at 25 °C [77 °F], 100 kPa). verify (what is ?) Infobox references

Adrenochrome is a chemical compound produced by the oxidation of adrenaline (epinephrine). It was the subject of limited research from the 1950s through to the 1970s as a potential cause of schizophrenia. While adrenochrome has no currently proven medical application, the semicarbazide derivative, carbazochrome, is a hemostatic medication. Adrenochrome is mass produced and commercially available to the public, and is not a controlled substance.

Despite its name, adrenochrome has no connection to the element chromium. The suffix '-chrome' refers to color, as solid adrenochrome is deep violet.

== Chemistry ==
The oxidation reaction that converts adrenaline into adrenochrome occurs both in vivo and in vitro. Silver oxide (Ag_{2}O) was among the first reagents employed for this, but a variety of other oxidizing agents have been used successfully. In solution, adrenochrome is pink and further oxidation of the compound causes it to polymerize into brown or black melanin compounds.

=== Synthesis ===
Adrenochrome is readily synthesized from commercially available reagents: chloroacetic acid and catechol react in the presence of phosphoryl chloride to yield chloroacetylcatechol. After purification, chloroacetylcatechol is reacted with aqueous methylamine and treated with hydrochloric acid, yielding adrenalone hydrochloride. This is then hydrogenated to racemic adrenaline. Finally, adrenaline is oxidized to adrenochrome by an appropriate oxidizing agent such as silver oxide.

== History ==
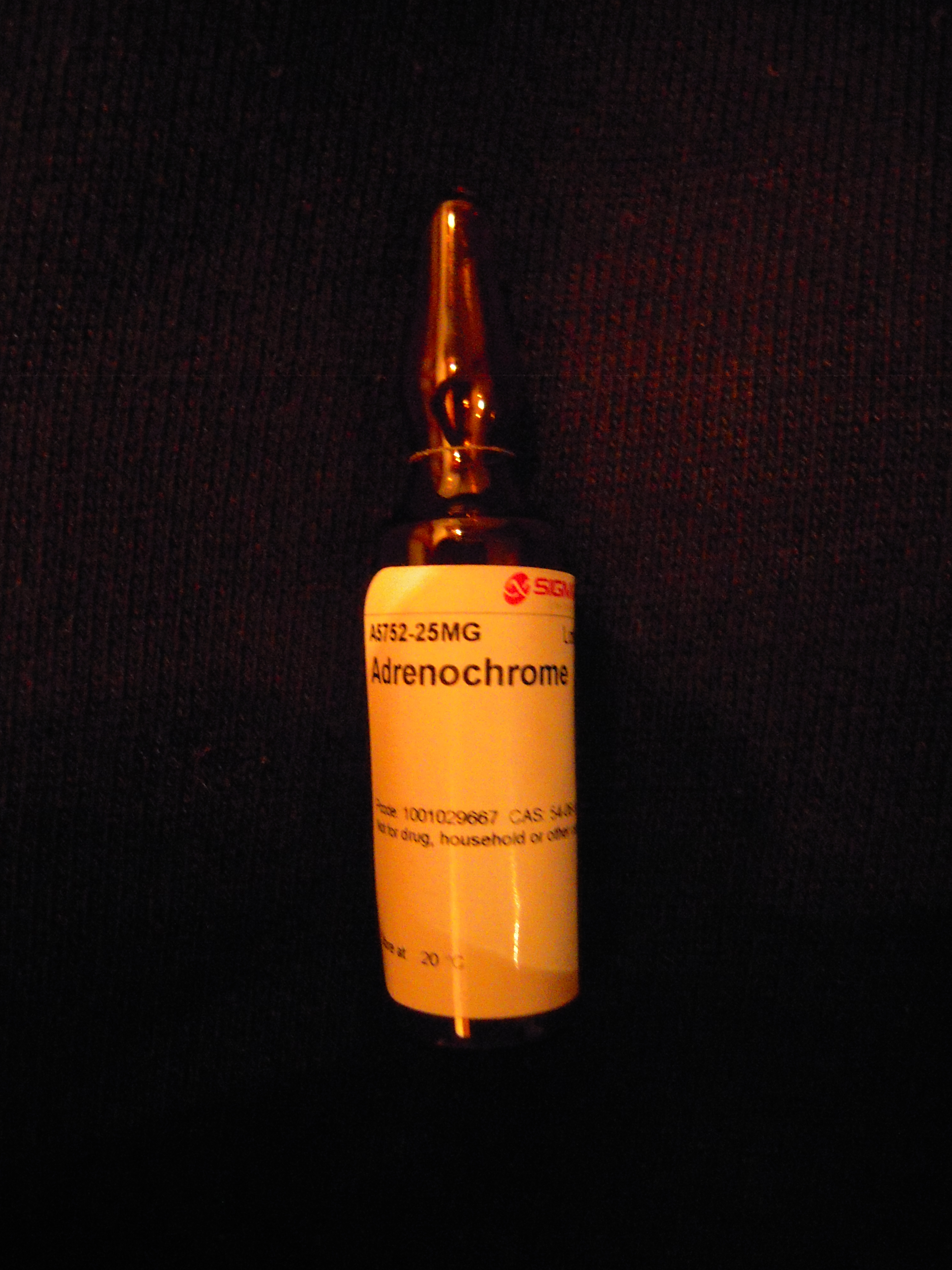
An adrenochrome ampoule

Several small-scale studies involving 15 or fewer test subjects conducted in the 1950s and 1960s reported that adrenochrome triggered psychotic reactions such as thought disorder and derealization.

In 1954, researchers Abram Hoffer and Humphry Osmond claimed that adrenochrome is a neurotoxic, psychotomimetic substance and may play a role in schizophrenia and other mental illnesses. In what Hoffer called the "adrenochrome hypothesis", he and Osmond in 1967 speculated that megadoses of vitamin C and niacin could cure schizophrenia by reducing brain adrenochrome.

The treatment of schizophrenia with such potent anti-oxidants is controversial. In 1973, the American Psychiatric Association reported methodological flaws in Hoffer's work on niacin as a schizophrenia treatment and referred to follow-up studies that did not confirm any benefits of the treatment. Multiple additional studies in the United States, Canada, and Australia similarly failed to find benefits of megavitamin therapy to treat schizophrenia.

The adrenochrome theory of schizophrenia waned, despite some evidence that it may be psychotomimetic, as adrenochrome was not detectable in people with schizophrenia.

In the early 2000s, interest was renewed by the discovery that adrenochrome may be produced normally as an intermediate in the formation of neuromelanin. This finding may be significant because adrenochrome is detoxified at least partially by glutathione-S-transferase. Some studies have found genetic defects in the gene for this enzyme.

Adrenochrome is also believed to have cardiotoxic properties.

== Conspiracy allegations ==
Adrenochrome is the subject of several conspiracy theories, including QAnon and Pizzagate, in which the chemical plays a similar role to Satanic ritual abuse stories. The theories commonly say that a cabal of Satanists rape and murder children, and harvest adrenochrome from their victims' blood as a recreational drug or as an elixir of youth, as with children's blood infusions. In reality, adrenochrome has been produced by organic synthesis since at least 1952 and is synthesized for research purposes by biotechnology companies, which will then sell it to anyone; as it is not a controlled substance, medical or recreational use of the chemical is easy to access.

== In popular culture ==
- In his 1954 book The Doors of Perception, Aldous Huxley mentions the discovery and alleged effects of adrenochrome, which he likens to the symptoms of mescaline intoxication, though he had never consumed it.
- Anthony Burgess mentions adrenochrome as "drencrom" at the beginning of his 1962 novel A Clockwork Orange. The protagonist and his friends are drinking drug-laced milk: "They had no license for selling liquor, but there was no law yet against prodding some of the new veshches which they used to put into the old moloko, so you could peet it with vellocet or synthemesc or drencrom or one or two other veshches".
- Hunter S. Thompson mentioned adrenochrome in his 1971 book Fear and Loathing in Las Vegas. This is the likely origin of current myths about the compound, because a character says, "There's only one source for this stuff ... the adrenaline glands from a living human body. It's no good if you get it out of a corpse." The adrenochrome scene also appears in the novel's film adaptation. In the DVD commentary, director Terry Gilliam admits that his and Thompson's portrayal is a fictional exaggeration. Gilliam says the drug is entirely fictional and seems unaware of the existence of a substance with the same name. Thompson also mentions adrenochrome in his book Fear and Loathing on the Campaign Trail '72. In the footnotes in chapter April, page 140, he says: "It was sometime after midnight in a ratty hotel room and my memory of the conversation is hazy, due to massive ingestion of booze, fatback, and forty cc's of adrenochrome."

== See also ==
- Adrenolutin
- 'Loosh', a supposed 'energy' produced by human suffering according to believers in out-of-body experiences
