= Mauve =

Pale purple colour

Mauve (mallow)

Color coordinates
- Hex triplet: #E0B0FF
- sRGB^{B} (r, g, b): (224, 176, 255)
- HSV (h, s, v): (276°, 31%, 100%)
- CIELCh_{uv} (L, C, h): (79, 61, 290°)
- Source: Maerz and Paul
- ISCC–NBS descriptor: Brilliant purple
- B: Normalized to [0–255] (byte)

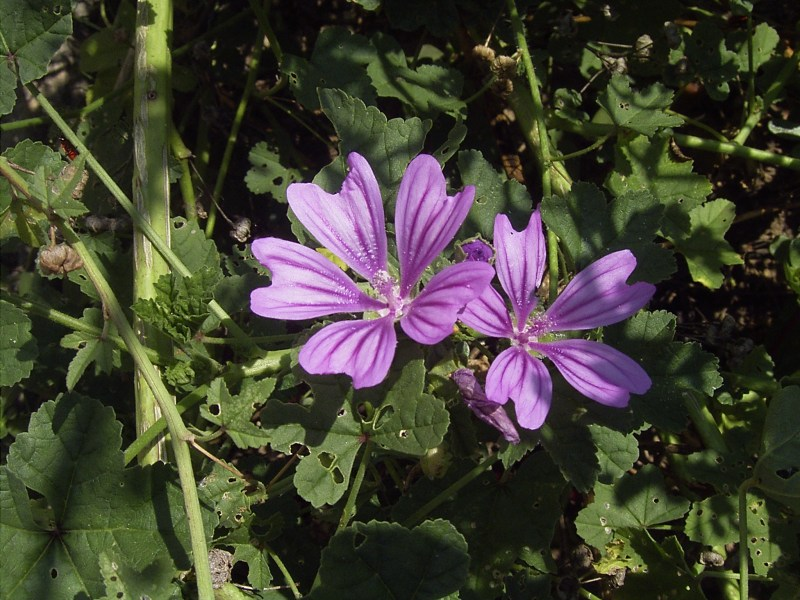
Mallow wildflower

Mauve (/ˈmoʊv/ MOHV; /ˈmɔːv/ MAWV) is a pale purple color named after the mallow flower (French: mauve). The first use of the word mauve as a color was in 1796–1798 according to the Oxford English Dictionary, but its use seems to have been rare before 1859. Another name for the color is mallow, with the first recorded use of mallow as a color name in English in 1611.

Mauve contains more gray and more blue than a pale tint of magenta. Many pale wildflowers called "blue" are more accurately classified as mauve. Mauve is also sometimes described as pale violet.

== Mauveine, the first commercial aniline dye ==
The synthetic dye mauve was first so named in 1859. Chemist William Henry Perkin, then 18, was attempting to synthesize quinine in 1856; quinine was used to treat malaria. He noticed an unexpected residue, which turned out to be the first aniline dye. Perkin originally named the dye Tyrian purple after the historical dye, but the product was renamed mauve after it was marketed in 1859. It is now usually called Perkin's mauve, mauveine, or aniline purple.

Earlier references to a mauve dye in 1856–1858 referred to a color produced using the semi-synthetic dye murexide or a mixture of natural dyes. Perkin was so successful in marketing his discovery to the dye industry that his 2000 biography by Simon Garfield is simply entitled Mauve. Between 1859 and 1861, mauve became a fashion must-have. The weekly journal All the Year Round described women wearing the colour as "all flying countryward, like so many migrating birds of purple paradise". Punch magazine published cartoons poking fun at the huge popularity of the colour: "The Mauve Measles are spreading to so serious an extent that it is high time to consider by what means [they] may be checked."

But, because it faded easily, the success of mauve dye was short-lived; by 1873, it was replaced by other synthetic dyes. As the memory of the original dye soon receded, the contemporary understanding of mauve is as a lighter, less-saturated color than it was originally known.

The 1890s are sometimes referred to in retrospect as the "Mauve Decade" because of the popularity of the subtle color among progressive artistic types, both in Europe and the US.

== Variations ==
=== Rich mauve ===
Mauve (Crayola)

Color coordinates
- Hex triplet: #E285FF
- sRGB^{B} (r, g, b): (226, 133, 255)
- HSV (h, s, v): (286°, 48%, 100%)
- CIELCh_{uv} (L, C, h): (70, 91, 295°)
- Source: Crayola
- ISCC–NBS descriptor: Vivid purple
- B: Normalized to [0–255] (byte)

The color displayed at right is the rich tone of mauve called mauve by Crayola.

=== French mauve (deep mauve) ===
Mauve (Pourpre.com)

Color coordinates
- Hex triplet: #D473D4
- sRGB^{B} (r, g, b): (212, 115, 212)
- HSV (h, s, v): (300°, 46%, 83%)
- CIELCh_{uv} (L, C, h): (63, 76, 308°)
- Source: Pourpre.com
- ISCC–NBS descriptor: Vivid purple
- B: Normalized to [0–255] (byte)

The color displayed at right is the deep tone of mauve that is called mauve by Pourpre.com, a color list widely popular in France.

=== Opera mauve ===
Opera mauve

Color coordinates
- Hex triplet: #B784A7
- sRGB^{B} (r, g, b): (183, 132, 167)
- HSV (h, s, v): (319°, 28%, 72%)
- CIELCh_{uv} (L, C, h): (61, 34, 324°)
- Source: ISCC-NBS
- ISCC–NBS descriptor: Light reddish purple
- B: Normalized to [0–255] (byte)

The color displayed at right is opera mauve.

The first recorded use of opera mauve as a color name in English was in 1927.

=== Mauve taupe ===
Mauve taupe

Color coordinates
- Hex triplet: #915F6D
- sRGB^{B} (r, g, b): (145, 95, 109)
- HSV (h, s, v): (343°, 34%, 57%)
- CIELCh_{uv} (L, C, h): (46, 31, 354°)
- Source: ISCC-NBS
- ISCC–NBS descriptor: Grayish purplish red
- B: Normalized to [0–255] (byte)

The color displayed at right is mauve taupe.

The first recorded use of mauve taupe as a color name in English was in 1925.

=== Old mauve ===
Old mauve

Color coordinates
- Hex triplet: #673147
- sRGB^{B} (r, g, b): (103, 49, 71)
- HSV (h, s, v): (336°, 52%, 40%)
- CIELCh_{uv} (L, C, h): (28, 32, 348°)
- Source: ISCC-NBS
- ISCC–NBS descriptor: Dark purplish red
- B: Normalized to [0–255] (byte)

The color displayed at right is old mauve.

The first recorded use of old mauve as a color name in English was in 1925.

The normalized color coordinates for old mauve are identical to wine dregs, which was first recorded as a color name in English in 1924.

== See also ==
- Shades of purple
  - Lilac (color)
- Malvaria (Pyroluria), from the term mauve factor in Orthomolecular psychiatry
