= IHF =

IHF may stand for:

- Integration host factor, a bacterial DNA-binding protein
- International Handball Federation, international governing body of handball
- Iraqi Handball Federation, governing body of handball in Iraq
- International H.K.D. Federation, international governing body of hapkido
- International Hockey Federation, international governing body of field hockey
- Indian Hockey Federation, governing body of field hockey in India
- Institute for Health Freedom, a nonprofit disbanded in 2010 that reported on health privacy
