= Tylee =

Tylee is a surname. Notable people with the surname include:

- André Tylee, English psychiatrist
- Arthur Kellam Tylee, Canadian officer
- James Tylee, American politician
- Marion Tylee, New Zealand artist

Given name

- Tylee Craft (2001–2024), American football player
- Tylee Ryan, a victim in a 2019 murder case

== See also ==
- Ty Lee, a character in the television series Avatar: The Last Airbender
- Tylee Cottage Residency, an artist-in-residence programme in Whanganui, New Zealand
