= Alliance for Natural Health =

Advocacy group for pseudo-scientific alternative medical approaches

The Alliance for Natural Health (ANH) is an advocacy group founded in 2002 by Robert Verkerk and based in the United Kingdom. ANH was founded to raise funds to finance a legal challenge of the EU Food Supplement Directive. ANH lobbies against regulation of dietary supplements, in favour of pseudo-scientific alternative medicine, and advocates dietary and other lifestyle approaches to health. It also criticises established science showing that Megavitamin therapy lack any health benefit.

== Positions ==
ANH runs campaigns in favour of dietary supplements, "sustainable healthcare", and traditional medicinal cultures such as Ayurveda and traditional Chinese medicine. It also campaigns against GMOs, fluoridation of drinking water, corporate influence in agriculture, electromagnetic radiation, and the global harmonisation of the food trade by the United Nations Codex Alimentarius Commission.

The ANH believes that negative media publicity about nutrients such as vitamin E are merely a result of misinterpretations over the science. It also criticises the latest research proposing vitamin C supplementation does not protect against the common cold as having a number of fundamental flaws.

Verkerk has been quoted in newspapers criticising scientific findings from Journal of the American Medical Association and the Cochrane Collaboration, among others, which found that some antioxidant vitamin supplements may shorten lifespan.

Speaking at the inaugural "Scientific Research in Homoeopathy" conference held by the Complementary Medical Association (CMA) at the University of Westminster in June 2008, Verkerk said that it was "utterly inappropriate" to use randomised controlled trials (RCTs) to assess homoeopathy and other complementary medicines, arguing that "as soon as you put someone into a trial situation, you destroy many of the effects that exist between patient and practitioner."

Speaking to the BBC, Verkerk has alleged that EU standards on health claims favour bigger food companies, adding that big firms who had sufficient resources could play the system and claim health benefits simply by inserting a small amount of an approved ingredient such as Vitamin C into a product.

== Legal challenges ==
=== Legal challenge to European Union Food Supplements Directive ===
In 2004, along with two British trade associations, ANH legally challenged the European Union's Food Supplements Directive referred to the European Court of Justice by the High Court in London. The European Court of Justice's Advocate General said that the EU's plan to tighten rules on the sale of vitamins and nutritional supplements should be scrapped but was overruled by the European Court, which decided that the measures in question were necessary and appropriate for the purpose of protecting public health. ANH interpreted the ban as applying only to synthetically produced supplements - and not to vitamins and minerals normally found in or consumed as part of the diet. The European judges did acknowledge the Advocate General's concerns, stating that there must be clear procedures to allow substances to be added to the permitted list based on scientific evidence. They also said that any refusal to add a product to the list must be open to challenge in the courts.

=== Legal challenge to European Union Traditional Herbal Medicinal Products Directive ===
In March 2011, ANH announced its intention to launch a legal challenge to the European Union's Traditional Herbal Medicinal Products Directive. The Directive will be challenged first of all in the High Court in London, arguing that it is "disproportionate, non-transparent and discriminatory." ANH then hopes to have the case referred to the European Court of Justice in Luxembourg. It argues the new rules adversely impact alternative medicine practices such as Ayurveda and that the registration costs are affordable for single herbal products with big markets, such as echinacea, but not for small producers of compound herbal remedies.

=== Legal challenge to U.S. FDA's adoption of new manufacturing regulations ===
In April 2011, a U.S. federal judge ruled against a legal challenge by ANH to the U.S. Food and Drug Administration's adoption of new manufacturing regulations. U.S. District Judge Beryl Howell found that the regulations "did not exceed the FDA's statutory authority, are not impermissibly vague under the due process clause, and are not arbitrary and capricious under the Administrative Procedure Act." The complaint was filed in 2009 by ANH, along with Durk Pearson, Sandy Shaw and the Coalition to End FDA and FTC Censorship.

== See also ==
- Alliance for Natural Health USA
- Health freedom movement
