= Joseph Blacket =

English poet

- Born: Tunstall, North Yorkshire, England
- Died: 1810

Joseph Blacket (d. 1810) was an English poet.

Blacket was born, according to his own testimony, at the obscure village of Tunstall, North Yorkshire, two miles from Catterick and about five from Richmond. His father was a day labourer, and had for many years been employed in the service of Sir John Lawson, baronet, whose goodness and humanity to the neighbouring poor rendered him, according to Blacket's account, universally beloved. Joseph was the youngest but one-not the youngest, as is commonly stated-of a dozen children. Up to the age of eleven he received an elementary education; in 1797 his brother, a ladies' shoemaker in London, offered him work as his apprentice, with provision for seven years. He reached the metropolis by wagon in ten days. Young Blacket was addicted to books, and before he was fifteen had read Josephus, Eusebius' Ecclesiastical History, Foxe's Martyrs, and a number of other religious works. A visit to the theatre to see Kemble play Richard III turned his attention to Shakespeare. He married in 1804, and in 1807 his wife died of consumption. He suffered much from poverty, but sought consolation in composing poetry, and especially in attempting dramatic verse.

Blacket's first patron was his printer, William Merchant, who set up his poetry for nothing, and introduced him to his second patron, Mr. Pratt, "In the autumn of 1808", says this gentleman, "I received a variety of manuscripts, with a request that I should read and give my opinion of them". Mr. Pratt was at once struck by Joseph's genius. He drew a detailed parallel between Blacket and Bloomfield, whose muse had been cherished by Capel Lofft. Mr. Pratt took Blacket under his protection, and introduced him to the public with pride as a literary rarity. Meanwhile, however, Blacket was not inattentive to his trade, but ill-health compelled him to relinquish it. Friends enable him to take a sea voyage. He embarked, and arrived at the house of his brother-in-law, John Dixon, gamekeeper of Sir Ralph Milbanke, at Seaham, Sunderland, in August 1809. Milbanke, his Wife and daughter, interested themselves in him. He is satirically noticed in Byron's English Bards and Scotch Reviewers. The Duchess of Leeds troubled herself to obtain subscriptions towards "Specimens" of his poetry. But he died on 23 August, and was buried in Seaham churchyard. A plain monument bears the concluding lines of his own poem, "Reflections at Midnight," written in 1802, when he was but sixteen.

The "Dying Horse," in blank verse, is supposed to best exhibit Blacket's power of moral declamation. Of his dramatic skill "The Earl of Devon, or the Patriots", a tragedy in five acts, is quoted as a leading and conspicuous example. Mr. Pratt collected and published his "Remains" with a memoir. As, however, he knew him little more than eighteen months, he has fallen back upon the poet's letters to his brother, mother, etc., in writing his life. The letters are arranged in seven distinct series. Thus Joseph Blacket becomes his own biographer. He corresponded with the author of the "Farmer's Boy".

The full titles of his works are:

- Specimens of the Poetry of Joseph Blacket, London, 1809 (a private edition for limited circulation).
- The Remains of Joseph Blacket, consisting of Poems, Dramatic Sketches, The Times, an ode, and a Memoir of his Life, by Mr. Pratt, 2 vols. London, 1811.

The Remains of Joseph Blacket was reviewed by the Monthly Review, the Universal Magazine, and the New Annual Register.
