= Orthomolecular medicine =

Form of alternative medicine

Alternative medicine
- Claims: Health effects of dietary supplements, particularly vitamin megadoses.
- Related fields: Naturopathy
- Original proponents: Linus Pauling (coined term)
- MeSH: D009974

Orthomolecular medicine is a form of alternative medicine that claims to maintain human health through nutritional supplementation. It is rejected by evidence-based medicine. The concept builds on the idea of an optimal nutritional environment in the body and suggests that diseases reflect deficiencies in this environment. Treatment for disease, according to this view, involves attempts to correct "imbalances or deficiencies based on individual biochemistry" by use of substances such as vitamins, minerals, amino acids, trace elements and fatty acids. The notions behind orthomolecular medicine are not supported by sound medical evidence, and the therapy is not effective for chronic disease prevention; even the validity of calling the orthomolecular approach a form of medicine has been questioned since the 1970s.

The approach is sometimes referred to as megavitamin therapy, because its practice evolved out of, and in some cases still uses, doses of vitamins and minerals many times higher than the recommended dietary intake. Orthomolecular practitioners may also incorporate a variety of other styles of treatment into their approaches, including dietary restriction, megadoses of non-vitamin nutrients and mainstream pharmaceutical drugs. Proponents argue that non-optimal levels of certain substances can cause health issues beyond simple vitamin deficiency and see balancing these substances as an integral part of health.

American chemist Linus Pauling coined the term "orthomolecular" in the 1960s to mean "the right molecules in the right amounts" (ortho- in Greek implies "correct"). Proponents of orthomolecular medicine hold that treatment must be based on each patient's individual biochemistry.

The scientific and medical consensus holds that the broad claims of efficacy advanced by advocates of orthomolecular medicine are not adequately tested as drug therapies. It has been described as a form of food faddism and as quackery. There are specific narrow applications where mainstream research has supported benefits for nutrient supplementation, and where conventional medicine uses vitamin treatments for some diseases.

Some vitamins in large doses have been linked to increased risk of cardiovascular disease, cancer and death. The scientific consensus view is that for normal individuals, a balanced diet contains all necessary vitamins and minerals and that routine supplementation is not necessary outside of specific diagnosed deficiencies.

== History and development ==
In the early 20th century, some doctors hypothesised that vitamins could cure disease, and supplements were prescribed in megadoses by the 1930s. Their effects on health were disappointing, though, and in the 1950s and 1960s, nutrition was de-emphasised in standard medical curricula. The word "orthomolecular" was coined by Linus Pauling in 1967.

Amongst the individuals described posthumously as orthomolecularists are Max Gerson, who developed a diet that he claimed could treat diseases, which the American Medical Association's 1949 Council on Pharmacy and Chemistry found ineffective; and Evan Shute and his brother, who attempted to treat heart disease with vitamin E. Several concepts now cited by orthomolecularists, including individual biochemical variation and inborn errors of metabolism, debuted in scientific papers early in the 20th century.

In 1948, William McCormick theorized that vitamin C deficiency played an important role in many diseases and began to use large doses in patients. In the 1950s, Fred R. Klenner also tried vitamin C megadosage as a therapy for a wide range of illnesses, including polio. Irwin Stone stated that organisms that do not synthesise their own vitamin C due to a loss-of-function mutation have a disease he called "hypoascorbemia". This term is not used by the medical community, and the idea of an organism-wide lack of a biosynthetic pathway as a disease was not endorsed by Stone's contemporaries.

In the 1950s, some individuals believed that vitamin deficiencies caused mental illness. Psychiatrists Humphry Osmond and Abram Hoffer gave people having acute schizophrenic episodes high doses of niacin, while William Kaufman used niacinamide. While niacin has no known efficacy in psychiatric disease, the use of niacin in combination with statins and other medical therapies has become one of several medical treatments for cardiovascular disease.

In the late 1960s, Linus Pauling introduced the expression "orthomolecular" to express the idea of the right molecules in the right amounts. Since the first claims of medical breakthroughs with vitamin C by Pauling and others, findings on the health effects of vitamin C have been controversial and contradictory. Pauling's claims have been criticised as overbroad.

Later research branched out into nutrients besides niacin and vitamin C, including essential fatty acids.

== Scope ==
According to Abram Hoffer, orthomolecular medicine does not purport to treat all diseases, nor is it "a replacement for standard treatment. A proportion of patients will require orthodox treatment, a proportion will do much better on orthomolecular treatment, and the rest will need a skillful blend of both." Nevertheless, advocates have said that the right nutrients at the optimum dose for the individual concerned can prevent, treat, and sometimes cure a wide range of medical conditions. Conditions for which orthomolecular practitioners have claimed some efficacy are: acne, alcoholism, allergies, arthritis, autism, bee stings, bipolar disorder, burns, cancer, the common cold, depression, drug addiction, drug overdose, epilepsy, heart diseases, heavy metal toxicity, acute hepatitis, herpes, hyperactivity, hypertension, hypoglycemia, influenza, learning disabilities, mental and metabolic disorders, migraine, mononucleosis, mushroom poisoning, neuropathy & polyneuritis (including multiple sclerosis), osteoporosis, polio, a hypothesised condition called "pyroluria", radiation sickness, Raynaud's disease, mental retardation, schizophrenia, shock, skin problems, snakebite, spider bite, tetanus toxin and viral pneumonia.

== Orthomolecular psychiatry ==
Hoffer believed that particular nutrients could cure mental illness. In the 1950s, he attempted to treat schizophrenia with niacin, although proponents of orthomolecular psychiatry say that the ideas behind their approach predate Hoffer. According to Hoffer and others who called themselves "orthomolecular psychiatrists", psychiatric syndromes result from biochemical deficiencies, allergies, toxicities or several hypothetical contributing conditions which they termed pyroluria, histadelia and histapenia. These purported causes were said to be found during an "individual biochemical workup" and treated with megavitamin therapy and dietary changes including fasting. These diagnoses and treatments are not accepted by evidence-based medicine.

== Principles ==
According to Abram Hoffer, "primitive" peoples do not consume processed foods and do not have "degenerative" diseases. In contrast, typical "Western" diets are said to be insufficient for long-term health, necessitating the use of megadose supplements of vitamins, dietary minerals, proteins, antioxidants, amino acids, ω-3 fatty acids, ω-6 fatty acids, medium-chain triglycerides, dietary fiber, short and long chain fatty acids, lipotropes, systemic and digestive enzymes, other digestive factors, and prohormones to ward off hypothetical metabolism anomalies at an early stage, before they cause disease.

Orthomolecularists say that they provide prescriptions for optimal amounts of micronutrients after individual diagnoses based on blood tests and personal histories. Lifestyle and diet changes may also be recommended. The battery of tests ordered includes many that are not considered useful by medicine.

== Prevalence ==
Orthomolecular medicine is practiced by few medical practitioners.

A survey released in May, 2004 by the National Center for Complementary and Alternative Medicine focused on who used alternative medicine, what was used, and why it was used in the United States by adults age 18 years and over during 2003. The survey reported uses in the previous twelve months that include orthomolecular related uses: Nonvitamin, nonmineral, natural products 18.9%, Diet-based therapies 3.5%, Megavitamin therapy 2.8%.

Another recent CAM survey reported that 12% of liver disease patients used the antioxidant silymarin, more than 6% used vitamins, and that "in all, 74% of patients reported using CAM in addition to the medications prescribed by their physician, but 26% did not inform their physician of their CAM use."

Even though the health benefits are not established, the use of high doses of vitamins is also common in people who have been diagnosed with cancer. According to Cancer Research UK, cancer patients should always seek professional advice before taking such supplements, and using them as a substitute for conventional treatment "could be harmful to [their] health and greatly reduce the chance of curing or controlling [their] cancer".

== Medical and scientific reception ==
=== Methodology ===
Orthomolecular therapies have been criticized as lacking a sufficient evidence base for clinical use: their scientific foundations are too weak, the studies that have been performed are too few and too open to interpretation, and reported positive findings in observational studies are contradicted by the results of more rigorous clinical trials. Accordingly, "there is no evidence that orthomolecular medicine is effective". Proponents of orthomolecular medicine strongly dispute this statement by citing studies demonstrating the effectiveness of treatments involving vitamins, though this ignores the belief that a normal diet will provide adequate nutrients to avoid deficiencies, and that orthomolecular treatments are not actually related to vitamin deficiency. The lack of scientifically rigorous testing of orthomolecular medicine has led to its practices being classed with other forms of alternative medicine and regarded as unscientific. It has been described as food faddism and quackery, with critics arguing that it is based upon an "exaggerated belief in the effects of nutrition upon health and disease." Orthomolecular practitioners will often use dubious diagnostic methods to define what substances are "correct"; one example is hair analysis, which produces spurious results when used in this fashion.

Proponents of orthomolecular medicine contend that, unlike some other forms of alternative medicine such as homeopathy, their ideas are at least biologically based and do not involve magical thinking, and are capable of generating testable hypotheses. Orthomolecular is not a standard medical term, and clinical use of specific nutrients is considered a form of chemoprevention (to prevent or delay development of disease) or chemotherapy (to treat an existing condition).

Despite a lack of evidence for its efficacy, interest in high dose vitamin C therapy via the intravenous route has not been permanently extinguished, and some research groups continue to investigate whether it has an effect as a possible cancer treatment.

=== Views on safety and efficacy ===
In general, the vitamin megadoses advocated by orthomolecular medicine are unsupported by scientific consensus. Some vitamins such as vitamins ADEK are toxic in high doses, including niacin (B_{3}), cholecalciferol (D) and tocopherol (E). The view of the medical community is that there is no evidence for the efficacy of Orthomolecular medicine as a treatment for cancer, and that high vitamin doses may – on the contrary – increase overall mortality. Nutritional treatments are not generally accepted as being helpful for psychological health. Its claims have been criticized by most medical organizations, including the American Cancer Society, the American Psychiatric Association, the National Institute of Mental Health, the American Academy of Pediatrics, CHAMPUS, and the Canadian Paediatric Society. The American Medical Association describes as "myths" the ideas that adequate nutrition is not readily achievable with normal food, all food grown with pesticide is poisonous, all food additives are poisonous, vitamin and mineral deficiencies are common, that the cause of most disease is poor diet, which can be prevented by nutritional supplements.

Similarly, the American Cancer Society comments that the current scientific evidence does not "support use of orthomolecular therapy for most of the conditions for which it is promoted." Some supplements have exhibited benefits for specific conditions, while a few have been confirmed to be harmful; the consumption of nutritious foods is the best recognized method to obtain vitamins, minerals, and nutrients crucial for good health. Barrie Cassileth, an adviser on alternative medicine to the National Institutes of Health, stated that "scientific research has found no benefit from orthomolecular therapy for any disease," and medical textbooks also report that there is "no evidence that megavitamin or orthomolecular therapy is effective in treating any disease."

A 1973 task force of the American Psychiatric Association unanimously concluded:

This review and critique has carefully examined the literature produced by megavitamin proponents and by those who have attempted to replicate their basic and clinical work. It concludes in this regard that the credibility of the megavitamin proponents is low. Their credibility is further diminished by a consistent refusal over the past decade to perform controlled experiments and to report their new results in a scientifically acceptable fashion. Under these circumstances this Task Force considers the massive publicity which they promulgate via radio, the lay press and popular books, using catch phrases which are really misnomers like "megavitamin therapy" and "orthomolecular treatment", to be deplorable.

In response to claims that orthomolecular medicine could cure childhood psychoses and learning disorders, the American Academy of Pediatrics labelled orthomolecular medicine a "cult" in 1976.

Proponents of orthomolecular medicine counter that some vitamins and nutrients are now used in medicine as treatments for specific diseases, such as megadose niacin and fish oil for dyslipidemias, and megavitamin therapies for a group of rare inborn errors of metabolism. A review in the Annals of Internal Medicine concluded that while some therapies might be beneficial, others might be harmful or interfere with effective medical therapy. A recent study of over 161,000 individuals provided, in the words of the authors, "convincing evidence that multivitamin use has little or no influence on the risk of common cancers, cardiovascular disease, or total mortality in postmenopausal women." A recent meta-analysis in JAMA suggested that supplementation with combinations of antioxidant vitamins (beta-carotene, vitamin A, and vitamin E) may increase mortality, although with respect to beta-carotene this conclusion may be due to the known harmful effect in smokers.

==== Safety ====
In the United States, pharmaceuticals must be proven safe and effective to the satisfaction of the FDA before they can be marketed, whereas dietary supplements must be proven unsafe before regulatory action can be taken. A number of orthomolecular supplements are available in the US in pharmaceutical versions that are sometimes quite similar in strength and general content, or in other countries are regulated as pharmaceuticals. The US regulations also have provisions to recognize a general level of safety for established nutrients that can forgo new drug safety tests. Proponents of orthomolecular medicine argue that supplements are less likely to cause dangerous side-effects or harm, since they are normally present in the body. Some vitamins are toxic in high doses and nearly all (with the possible exception of Vitamin C) will cause adverse effects given high levels of overdosing for prolonged periods as recommended by orthomolecular practitioners. Forgoing medical care in favor of orthomolecular treatments can lead to adverse health outcomes.

Health professionals see orthomolecular medicine as encouraging individuals to dose themselves with large amounts of vitamins and other nutrients without conventional supervision, which they worry might be damaging to health. Potential risks of inappropriate vitamin and supplement regimes include an increased risk of coronary heart disease, hypertension, thrombophlebitis, peripheral neuropathy, ataxia, neurological effects, liver toxicity, congenital abnormalities, spontaneous abortion, gouty arthritis, jaundice, kidney stones, and diarrhea. In their book Trick or Treatment?, Edzard Ernst and Simon Singh conclude that "The concepts of orthomolecular medicine are not biologically plausible and not supported by the results of rigorous clinical trials. These problems are compounded by the fact that orthomolecular medicine can cause harm and is often very expensive."

=== Example: vitamin E ===
Orthomolecular proponents claim that even large doses of vitamin E pose no risk to health and are useful for the treatment and prevention of a broad list of conditions, including heart and circulatory diseases, diabetes and nephritis. Initial hopes for the usefulness of vitamin E in orthomolecular medicine were based on epidemiological studies suggesting that people who consumed more vitamin E had lower risks of chronic disease, such as coronary heart disease. These observational studies could not distinguish between whether the higher levels of vitamin E improved health themselves, or whether confounding variables (such as other dietary factors or exercise) were responsible. To distinguish between these possibilities, a number of randomized controlled trials were performed and meta-analysis of these controlled clinical trials have not shown any clear benefit from any form of vitamin E supplementation for preventing chronic disease. Further clinical studies show no benefit of vitamin E supplements for cardiovascular disease. The current position of the American National Institutes of Health is that there is no convincing evidence that vitamin E supplements can prevent or treat any disease.

Beyond the lack of apparent benefit, a series of three meta-analyses reported that vitamin E supplementation is associated with an increased risk of death; one of the meta-analyses performed by the Cochrane Collaboration also found significantly increased mortality for the antioxidant vitamins A and beta-carotene. A subsequent meta-analysis found no mortality benefit from vitamin E, but also no increase in mortality either.

=== Use in AIDS ===
Several articles in the alternative-medicine literature have suggested that orthomolecular-related dietary supplementation might be helpful for patients with HIV/AIDS. A study using 250 mg and 1000 mg doses of vitamin C along with other antioxidants to treat people with AIDS did not find any benefit.

A meta analysis in 2010 (updated in 2017 with different results) found that micronutrient supplementation decreased the risk of death and improved outcomes in pregnant women with HIV in Africa. A 2017 Cochrane review found no strong evidence to suggest that micronutrient supplementation prevents death or is effective at slowing the progression of disease for adults with HIV. It is important for people living with HIV to eat a healthy adequate diet. For people with HIV that have clinically demonstrated deficiencies in micronutrients or for people who are not able to consume the recommended daily quantities of minerals and vitamins, supplementation is still encouraged. Vitamin A in children with HIV appears to be safe and beneficial. Vitamin A deficiency is found in children with HIV infection who may or may not have symptoms of AIDS. Vitamin A supplementation reduces morbidity and mortality in AIDS symptomatic children, but has no effect on asymptomatic children. It does not prevent HIV infection, cannot treat the chronic HIV infection, and will not cure AIDS.

==== Deaths resulting from illegal vitamin trials in South Africa ====
Matthias Rath has been extensively criticized for presenting his vitamin supplements as a treatment for AIDS and for testing them in illegal trials in South Africa. A former associate of Linus Pauling, Rath has promoted vitamins as a treatment for HIV infection, describing treatment with effective antiretroviral drugs as toxic and part of a global conspiracy serving the financial interests of the pharmaceutical industry. In a lawsuit that found against Rath, the South African Medical Association blamed his vitamin products for several deaths. The World Health Organization and two health agencies of the United Nations also described Rath's advertisements as "wrong and misleading" and "an irresponsible attack on ARV (antiretroviral) therapy." The South African Centre for Social Science Research described the trials as "state sponsored pseudo-science". Rath's trials, conducted with the aid of AIDS denialist David Rasnick, were declared unlawful by the Cape High Court; Rath, Rasnick and their foundation were barred from conducting further unauthorised clinical trials and from advertising their products.

=== Alleged institutional bias ===
Advocates of orthomolecular medicine, including Pauling, Hoffer and Ewan Cameron have claimed that their findings are actively suppressed by the medical and pharmaceutical industry. Hoffer wrote "There is no conspiracy led and directed by a single person or by a single organization. There is no Mafia in psychiatry. However, there is a conspiracy led and directed by a large number of professionals and their associations who have a common aim to protect their hard-earned orthodoxy, no matter what the cost to their opponent colleagues or to their patients."

The Journal of Orthomolecular Medicine, founded in 1967 as the Journal of Schizophrenia, is a major publication of orthomolecular medicine. As Abram Hoffer wrote:

We had to create our own journals because it was impossible to obtain entry into the official journals of psychiatry and medicine. Before 1967 I had not found it difficult to publish reports in these journals, and by then I had about 150 articles and several books in the establishment press.

Other members of the medical community deny the existence of such an institutional prejudice. A review in the Journal of Clinical Oncology denied that physicians collude against unconventional treatments. Claims of conspiracy were limited to the now defunct Linus Pauling Institute of Science and Medicine. In its current iteration, the Linus Pauling Institute derives a significant amount of funding from the National Institutes of Health and other federal sources.

== See also ==
- Fringe science
- Health freedom movement
- Life extension
- List of ineffective cancer treatments
- List of life extension related topics
- Nutrigenomics
- Orthopathy
- Orthorexia
- Carl Pfeiffer (pharmacologist)
- Vitamin C megadosage
- Hypervitaminosis
