= Alliance for Natural Health USA =

Advocacy group for pseudo-scientific alternative medical approaches

The Alliance for Natural Health USA (ANH-USA), formerly known as the American Association for Health Freedom, is a 501(c)(4) nonprofit organization dedicated to promoting alternative medicine and is associated with the libertarian health freedom movement. Located in Charlottesville, Virginia, the organization was founded in 1992 as the American Preventive Medical Association (APMA) and became a part of the international Alliance for Natural Health organization, headquartered in the United Kingdom, in 2009.

ANH-USA lobbies government, files lawsuits, and files comments on proposed rulings on behalf of consumers, medical practitioners, and companies in the natural health industry. They promote an integrative approach to health that includes dietary supplements, functional food, and other lifestyle changes which they assert will reduce healthcare costs to a sustainable level. ANH-USA runs a number of campaigns that focus on national and state policy issues affecting food safety, access to dietary supplements, organic foods, health claims, consumer choice in healthcare, and state medical boards.

== Legal challenge to U.S. FDA's adoption of new manufacturing regulations ==
In April 2011, a U.S. federal judge ruled against a legal challenge by the ANH to the U.S. Food and Drug Administration's adoption of new manufacturing regulations. U.S. District Judge Beryl Howell found that the regulations "did not exceed the FDA's statutory authority, are not impermissibly vague under the due process clause, and are not arbitrary and capricious under the Administrative Procedure Act." The complaint was filed in 2009 by the ANH, along with Durk Pearson, Sandy Shaw and the Coalition to End FDA and FTC Censorship.

== Health claims lawsuits ==
ANH-USA has been a plaintiff in several significant lawsuits against the Food and Drug Administration related to suppression of health claims for dietary supplements.

=== Pearson v. Shalala I ===
ANH-USA's predecessor organization, APMA, was a co-plaintiff in Pearson v. Shalala in 1998. Congress had previously authorized the FDA to pre-approve health claims on foods (including dietary supplements) but the FDA created an undefined and difficult standard for approving such health claims, and after 10 years had approved only 10 such claims. Supplement manufacturers Dirk Pearson and Sandy Shaw sued the FDA in federal court for refusing to allow four health claims on their products that were supported by science, based on the First Amendment and the FDA's failure to define their standard for accepting a health claim. The D.C. Appeals Court rejected the First Amendment argument, but ruled in favor of the appellants on the second argument, opining,

We agree with appellants that the [Administrative Procedures Act] requires the agency to explain why it rejects their proposed health claims—to do so adequately necessarily implies giving some definitional content to the phrase "significant scientific agreement." We think this proposition is squarely rooted in the prohibition under the APA that an agency not engage in arbitrary and capricious action. See 5 U.S.C. § 706(2)(A) (1994). It simply will not do for a government agency to declare—without explanation—that a proposed course of private action is not approved. See Motor Vehicle Mfrs. Ass'n v. State Farm Mut. Auto. Ins. Co., 463 U.S. 29, 43 (1983) ("[T]he agency must ... articulate a satisfactory explanation for its action ..."). To refuse to define the criteria it is applying is equivalent to simply saying no without explanation.

— Circuit Judge Silberman, Pearson v. Shalala

=== Pearson v. Shalala II ===
The APMA again joined Pearson and Shalala in suing the FDA in late 2000 for suppressing health claims that adequate intake of folic acid by pregnant women could prevent neural tube defects. The court opinion found that "It is clear that the FDA simply failed to comply with the constitutional guidelines outlined in Pearson [I]. Indeed, the agency appears to have at best, misunderstood, and at worst, deliberately ignored, highly relevant portions of the Court of Appeals Opinion." Additionally, "the FDA's conclusion that the 'weight' of the evidence was against Plaintiffs' Folic Acid Claim was arbitrary, capricious and otherwise in violation of law."

=== ANH v. Sebelius ===
ANH-USA was the lead plaintiff in a 2010 lawsuit against the FDA for denying further health claims and constructively suppressing other health claims by attaching disclaimers that effectively negated the preceding claim. The court found that "the FDA's decision to ban plaintiffs' colon and digestive tract claim because there is no credible evidence in support of it 'is unreasonable because it is not supported by a review of the available evidence or the FDA's own Guidance Report.' See Whitaker, 248 F. Supp. 2d at 13. Indeed, it appears that credible evidence (e.g., the Peters, Ghadrian, Criqui, and Willet studies) does support this claim. As such, complete suppression of the claim is unwarranted." Additionally, "the FDA has completely eviscerated plaintiffs' claim, with no explanation as to why a less restrictive approach would not be effective ... the FDA's replacement of plaintiffs' claim with different and contradictory language is inconsistent with the spirit, if not the letter, of Pearson I."

== See also ==
- Alliance for Natural Health
- Health freedom movement
