= Matthias Rath =

German businessman and doctor

- Born: 1955
- Died: 17 January 2026 (aged 70–71)

Matthias Rath (1955 – 2026) was a doctor, businessman, and vitamin salesman. He earned his medical degree in Germany. Rath claimed that a program of nutritional supplements (which he called "cellular medicine"), including formulations that he sold, can treat or cure diabetes, cardiovascular disease, cancer, and HIV/AIDS. These claims are not supported by any reliable medical research. Rath ran the Dr. Rath Health Foundation, has been closely associated with Health Now, Inc., and founded the Dr. Rath Research Institute.

The Sunday Times has described Rath as an "international campaigner for the use of natural remedies" whose "theories on the treatment of cancer have been rejected by health authorities all over the world." On HIV/AIDS, Rath has disparaged the pharmaceutical industry and denounced antiretroviral medication as toxic and dangerous, while claiming that his vitamin pills could reverse the course of AIDS. As a result, Rath has been accused of "potentially endangering thousands of lives" in South Africa, a country with a massive AIDS epidemic where Rath was active in the mid-2000s. The head of Médecins Sans Frontières in South Africa Eric Goemaere said of Rath, “This guy is killing people by luring them with unrecognised treatment without any scientific evidence”; Rath attempted to sue him.

Rath's claims and methods have been widely criticised by medical organisations, AIDS-activist groups, and the United Nations, among others. Former South African President Thabo Mbeki and former Minister of Health Manto Tshabalala-Msimang have also been criticised by the medical and AIDS-activist community for their perceived support of Rath's claims. According to doctors with Médecins Sans Frontières, the Treatment Action Campaign (a South African AIDS-activist group) and a former Rath colleague, unauthorised clinical trials run by Rath and his associates, using vitamins as therapy for HIV, resulted in deaths of some participants. In 2008, the Cape High Court found the trials unlawful, banned Rath and his foundation from conducting unauthorised clinical trials and from advertising their products, and instructed the South African Health Department to fully investigate Rath's vitamin trials. In 2008, Rath expanded his advertising to Russia, a country where the incidence of HIV/AIDS had been increasing.

== Background ==
Born in Stuttgart, Germany, Rath studied at the Hamburg University Medical School in Germany. After graduating, he began researching arteriosclerosis at the University Clinic of Hamburg. Later, during 1989 and 1990, he was a researcher at the Berlin Heart Centre. He subsequently joined two-time Nobel Prize laureate Linus Pauling at his research institute in California. Ultimately, Rath had a falling-out with the Linus Pauling Institute; after a series of lawsuits and countersuits, Rath was ordered in 1994 to pay the Institute $75,000 and was assigned several patents. Rath subsequently developed his own branded nutrient products, set up the Dr. Rath Health Foundation and Dr. Rath Research Institute, and funded nutrition research with patent development in what he called "Cellular Medicine".

Rath has offices in California, the United Kingdom, the Netherlands, and South Africa (Cape Town). His foundation also advertises its products in Spain, France, and Russia. According to Eversheds, Rath's solicitor, the Dr. Rath Health Foundation is "a not-for-profit body which conducts research into science-based natural therapies", but the foundation is estimated to have earned "millions" through nutritional supplement sales.

According to Rath, international events of the last century have been driven by pharmaceutical and oil companies. He claimed that these interests started and exploited World War II. In court filings, Rath and his lawyers write that the pharmaceutical industry then started apartheid in South Africa as part of a global conspiracy to "conquer and control the entire African continent." They specifically mention former Nazi officials and the German chemical company IG Farben as playing a central role in the alleged conspiracy. They also compare Rath's adversaries in court to Hitler's stormtroopers.

Rath suggested that the pharmaceutical industry continues to control international politics today, allowing 9/11 to occur and starting the Iraq War to divert attention from what he considered the failures of drug companies. On his website, Rath stated that United States President George W. Bush and Vice President Dick Cheney, at the behest of what Rath called the "pharmaceutical cartel", were planning a nuclear war in advance of the 4 November 2008 elections in the United States. Rath has made similar claims in the New York Times and other major newspapers around the world in the form of large advertisements reportedly designed to resemble newspaper editorials.

== Awards ==
In 2001, the American Preventive Medical Association and the National Foundation for Alternative Medicine, both health freedom advocacy groups, gave Rath the Bulwark of Liberty Award.

== Controversies ==
Rath's theories, claims, and research, particularly his efforts to persuade South Africans to use his vitamin supplements to treat HIV/AIDS, have been controversial.

== Illegal AIDS trials in South Africa ==
In 2005, according to Reuters, Rath's foundation distributed tens of thousands of pamphlets in poor black South African townships, such as Khayelitsha, claiming that HIV medication was "poison" and urging HIV-positive people to instead use vitamins such as those Rath sold to treat HIV/AIDS. People with "advanced AIDS" were then recruited by the Rath Foundation and its surrogates for what the Rath Foundation called "a clinical pilot study in HIVpositive [sic] patients" Personnel of the South Africa National Civic Organisation (Sanco) administered the programme in Khayelitsha as "agents for the Rath foundation."

Patients were recruited for the study with offers of money or food and instructed to stop taking conventional HIV/AIDS medications. Luthando Nogcinisa, a local Communist Party official, said that Rath agents recruited known HIV-positive individuals, "often with a pack of groceries, and they encourage the person not to take the antiretrovirals, but to rather take the vitamins". Mike Waters, Democratic Alliance health spokesperson, states that Rath gave patients "food parcels to convince them to give up their antiretrovirals and take his vitamin C supplements instead."

Rath Foundation employees reportedly infiltrated HIV/AIDS clinics in Khayelitsha and paid clinic staff to provide them with names of patients. The Guardian described a case in which a pregnant woman newly diagnosed with HIV was visited at home by Rath Health Foundation employees and convinced to stop taking her antiretroviral medication in favour of Rath's vitamins; she died three months later. The Rath Foundation disputed that patients were asked to stop taking effective antiviral medication. Rath's lawyers also claimed that the trial was actually a "community nutrition programme" to which Rath contributed vitamins.

Five trial participants stated in affidavits that they were stripped to their underwear, photographed, and forced to have their blood drawn. They were told to take pills containing what were said to be high doses of vitamins, including Rath's VitaCell. Demetre Labadarios, who leads the Human Nutrition programme at Stellenbosch University, questioned the safety of administering high doses of supplements to already sick patients.

During and immediately following the vitamin trials, "many people died," deaths Rath's adversaries attributed to lack of effective medication. Sanco-Rath clinic workers reportedly instructed patients to return to the clinic in the event of medical emergency, rather than going to hospital.

The Treatment Action Campaign (TAC) and the South African Medical Association (SAMA) took the Rath Foundation to court to prevent further unauthorised trials and stop the foundation's claims that vitamins could treat or cure HIV/AIDS. Rath's lawyer said that he had never claimed his vitamin products were a cure for HIV/AIDS, adding that Rath's only involvement in the affair was the donation of vitamins to the South African National Civics Organisation. TAC and SAMA prevailed in court over Rath and the Medicines Control Council on unauthorised trials and advertising of Rath's nutrients as a replacement therapy for HIV.

In September 2008 Rath was ordered to pay court costs in an unsuccessful libel action against The Guardian (UK) after the paper reported on his foundation's unauthorised drug trials in South Africa.

== Efficacy and marketing claims ==
=== SKAK ===
In 2004 the Swiss Study Group for Complementary and Alternative Methods in Cancer (SKAK), an independent group that evaluates alternative medical treatments, examined Rath's vitamin preparations and marketing claims. SKAK reported that it "found no proof that the vitamin preparations of Dr. Matthias Rath have any effect on human cancer" and "advise[s] against their use in cancer prevention and treatment while recommending a diet rich in fruit and vegetables." SKAK's report specifically criticised Rath for:

- Making sweeping, unsubstantiated claims of efficacy. Rath has claimed that his vitamin treatments can cure all forms of cancer, as well as most infectious diseases, including AIDS.
- Citing anecdotal reports of success that could not be confirmed. In the case of one patient allegedly "cured" by Rath's methods, SKAK found that "it is not even certain from a medical perspective if cancer was present."
- Using a self-developed test of efficacy rather than widely accepted and verified tests and endpoints.

SKAK's conclusion regarding Rath's vitamin formulations was:

A cancer-curing effect has not been documented for any of these substances. Nor is there any proof that the preparations sold by Matthias Rath, some with high dosages, are useful in cancer prevention—leave alone curing cancer. Rath still owes proof regarding the correctness of his claims. Proof of effect cannot be provided by analogy with in vitro, animal or cell experiments. Because there is no proof for effect nor for the harmlessness of the preparations, SKAK advises against their use.

=== Harvard multivitamin study ===
Rath claimed that a Harvard School of Public Health study published in the New England Journal of Medicine validated claims that multivitamin supplementation slows the progression of HIV to AIDS. The study's authors released a statement condemning Rath's "irresponsible and misleading statements, as in our view they deliberately misinterpret findings from our studies to advocate against the scale-up of antiretroviral therapy." The authors felt that Rath had misused their results to argue that multivitamins should be used in place of antiretroviral medication. They affirmed the central role of antiretroviral medication in treating AIDS and indicated that multivitamins should be at most a supplementary treatment.

=== Use of published medical literature ===
A 1998 British Medical Journal article examined some of Rath's and Health Now's claims in support of Rath's multivitamin supplement blend. The authors found that Rath listed 40 citations to support his product but that only eight of them were of actual clinical trials. After examining these clinical trials, the authors concluded that despite Rath's claims to the contrary, "no general clinical benefit of vitamins C and E and carotene can be proved from the works cited by Health Now."

=== Claims of WHO and UN support ===
Rath's advertising material has suggested that his nutritional supplements are superior to antiretroviral therapy in the treatment of HIV/AIDS and implied that his claims were endorsed by the World Health Organization, UNICEF, and UNAIDS. These agencies issued a joint statement condemning Rath's advertisements as "wrong and misleading".

== Criticism ==
=== Credentials ===
The Democratic Alliance (DA), an official opposition party in South Africa, said Rath was representing himself as a medical doctor in his literature distributed in South Africa, and claimed that this was against the law since he was not registered as a doctor in South Africa. The DA filed complaints with the Health Professions Council of South Africa and the police. The Health Professions Council said it could not discipline Rath since its jurisdiction is restricted to registered doctors.

A lawyer representing Rath responded to the complaints by stating that the title 'Dr.' referred in Rath's case to "a PHD doctorate he had obtained and his position as a researcher, not a medical doctor."

Other sources, however, describe Rath as a "qualified doctor" and state that he "obtained his basic medical degree in 1985, after studying in Munster and Hamburg" and "became a researcher first at the University Clinic in Hamburg and then, during 1989 and 1990, at the Berlin Heart Centre....In 2003, the regional court in Berlin banned Rath from calling himself in his adverts 'the renowned doctor' and/or 'the renowned scientist', after a court case in which medical and scientific witnesses said he was neither. In the same year, Rath's theories and micronutrients were disavowed by the respected and influential Swiss Study Group for Complementary and Alternative Methods in Cancer."

=== South African Council of Churches ===
To address the "confusion" created by Rath's advertising campaign, the South African Council of Churches issued a statement that Rath's activities in South Africa "can only be interpreted as misguided strategies to promote Rath's own brand of nutritional supplements." The Council affirmed the importance of both antiretroviral medication and good nutrition for people with HIV, and pointed out that multivitamins are distributed by public health services and need not be obtained from Rath's organisation.

== Legal cases ==
Rath has been involved in a number of legal cases.

- In 2000, the Court of Almelo in the Netherlands ordered Rath to stop making unfounded, false, and defamatory statements about the Dutch pharmaceutical company Numico.
- In 2002, the British Advertising Standards Authority found that advertisements by Rath contained a series of misleading and false claims and ordered the claims removed.
- In 2002, the United States Food and Drug Administration notified Rath that he was promoting his vitamin supplements in a manner that violated the Federal Food, Drug, and Cosmetic Act, by making claims of efficacy without undergoing the appropriate scientific and regulatory review.
- In 2005, the Advertising Standards Association of South Africa (ASASA) issued three separate rulings against Rath, finding that he had made false and misleading claims regarding the effectiveness of his supplements and describing his advertisements as "reckless in the extreme". Rath continued the advertisements, leading the ASASA to rule that, "in light of the gravity of [Rath's] breaches", he was required to submit all further advertising to the ASASA for prior approval.
- In 2006, the High Court of South Africa found that Rath had defamed the Treatment Action Campaign (TAC), an AIDS nonprofit organisation, by publicly making false and misleading statements about the TAC. Rath was ordered to cease his defamatory remarks "to ensure that the TAC's continued participation in the debate is not hamstrung by defamatory and unfounded allegations."
- In 2006, the 22 July issue of the British Medical Journal (BMJ) reported that Rath had gone on trial in Hamburg "for fraud" in relation to the death of Dominik Feld. The BMJ subsequently retracted its report "on legal advice" and apologised to Rath, stating that the BMJ accepted that "the allegations we published were without foundation." A subsequent libel claim by Rath was settled by the BMJ for £100,000.
- In 2006, Rath was prosecuted in Germany for distributing vitamins over the internet without a pharmaceutical licence, and for claiming on his website that the vitamins could cure cancer. Rath settled the case with a EUR33,000 fine, paid to an organisation helping disabled children, and amended the website. The judge noted that the case had not given an impression of "charlatanry", but rather of excessively aggressive marketing.
- In 2007, the German Federal Constitutional Court issued a ruling in favour of Rath, finding that the prohibition of the brochure and poster "Stop the pharmacartel" and "Stop the codex-plans of the pharmacartel" by judgements of courts in Berlin in 2000/2001 was unjustified as it violated Rath's fundamental rights, e.g. the right of free speech.
- In 2008, the Cape Town High Court issued an interdict barring Rath from advertising his products as a treatment for AIDS, and stating that the clinical trials he has been running in black townships are illegal. The ruling also found that "Health Minister Manto Tshabalala-Msimang and her department had a duty to investigate Rath's activities."
- In 2008 Rath sued Ben Goldacre and The Guardian for libel in three articles describing Rath's activities in South Africa. In September 2008, Rath dropped his suit and was ordered to pay costs, an interim amount of about £220,000. Goldacre has expressed interest in writing a "meticulously referenced" work on Rath, and South African AIDS denialism in general, based on material that had been excised from his column during the litigation. A chapter about Rath in Goldacre's Bad Science that was omitted from the first edition due to the litigation was reinstated in the paperback edition in early 2009, made available on his website, and licensed for free distribution.

== See also ==
- List of ineffective cancer treatments
