= Evan Shute =

Canadian obstetrician (1905–1978)

- Born: October 21, 1905; Bruce County
- Died: 1978 (aged 72–73); London, Ontario
- Occupation: Obstetrician

Evan Vere Shute (October 21, 1905 – 1978) F.R.C.S.C. was a Canadian obstetrician, poet and writer best known for advocating vitamin E therapy to treat cardiovascular disease and many other diseases. His studies were not controlled and his results were not confirmed by other medical researchers.

== Biography ==
Shute was born in Bruce County and was raised on a farm near Lion's Head with his younger brothers Wilfrid and Wallace. His parents were Richard James Shute and Elizabeth Jane Treadgold. Shute and his brothers became medical doctors. Evan and Wilfrid graduated from the University of Toronto. He obtained his B.A. in 1924 and M.B. in 1927. He married Marian Roberta, they had five children. He was Research Assistant of Obstetrics and Gynaecology at University of Western Ontario (1933–1939). Shute served as president for the Canadian Society for Study of Fertility and was an associate member of the Royal Society of Medicine.

Shute authored children's stories, poetry and verse under the pen name Vere Jameson.

== Vitamin E therapy ==
In the 1930s, Shute and his brother Wilfrid, a cardiologist, became advocates of Vitamin E therapy. In 1946, Shute, Wilfrid and Albert Vogelsang reported that large doses of vitamin E are beneficial to treat four major types of heart disease. However, these claims were not confirmed by the medical community. In 1948, Shute and Wilfrid founded the Shute Medical Clinic (also known as the Shute Institute) in London, Ontario, at 10 Grand Avenue where they treated patients with Vitamin E therapy. In 1949, the Shute Institute began to publish the journal, The Summary. This was published because Shute had difficulty publishing his research in North American medical journals. Shute and Wilfrid recommended their patients to take 400–600 International Units (IU) of vitamin E per day; later they advocated 800 IU per day or over. They warned individuals with high blood pressure not to take any vitamin E supplements before their blood pressure was controlled.

Shute stated that vitamin E could be used to treat heart disease as he had used it to treat his mother's angina attacks. In 1954, Shute and his brother received widespread media coverage as the Time magazine published a supportive article on their vitamin E therapy. Shute lectured on the subject but after clinical trials did not support his claims he was barred from addressing major medical conferences. During this time, many dangerous and unproven health claims were being promoted about vitamin E therapy causing the United States Postal Service to ban vitamin E literature with unproven health claims from the mail.

Shute received support from alternative health advocates such as Adelle Davis and J. I. Rodale. Rodale visited Shute's clinic and was impressed so began taking 1, 200 IU of vitamin E every day (24 times the 1990 Recommended Dietary Allowance). Rodale wrote that taking vitamin E in large doses would prevent him from having a heart attack, however, he died from a heart attack, age 72. In 1969, Shute authored the book The Heart and Vitamin E, published by his Shute Foundation for Medical Research. The book recommended large doses of vitamin E for the prevention and treatment of many diseases and disorders including angina, gangrene, heart disease, nephritis, stroke, varicose veins and to heal wounds and scars.

By 1972, the sales of vitamin E in the United States had increased by 500%. The same year, Shute told Newsweek that "It provides better circulation and enhances the power of the muscles. Almost nothing in the body wouldn't be improved by a large intake of vitamin E." Linus Pauling wrote approvingly of Shute's vitamin E therapy. In 1987, Pauling wrote that "there is no doubt that Wilfrid Shute and Evan Shute were convinced that vitamin E is the most important substance in the world. I confess to having the same feeling about vitamin C."

=== Criticism ===
Shute's health claims about vitamin E have never been scientifically demonstrated. Drs. Robert E. Olson, Robert Hodges and Terence Anderson who examined Shute's claims found that vitamin E therapy has no benefit for angina from well-designed studies published between 1946 and 1972. They noted that Shute's case studies were poorly-designed and that all available trials on the subject have been negative. Dr. Hodges in a 1973 review noted that none of the Shute brothers studies were controlled and concluded that "massive doses of vitamin E are useless in the prevention or treatment of coronary heart disease." Victor Herbert also stated that none of Shute's health claims about vitamin E were based on well designed experimental studies and quoted Shute as opposing controlled trials as unethical. In 1978, nutritionist Fredrick J. Stare commented:

The primary usefulness of vitamin E, according to Dr. Shute and his associates, was in the treatment and prevention of heart disease. Is there any basis to this claim? No, unfortunately there is not. The American Heart Association, the American Medical Association and the Food and Drug Administration, among other groups, have all reported that vitamin E has no value in heart disease or in any other condition with the exception of vitamin E deficiency. So who are you going to believe? One obstetrician or thousands of medical scientists and cardiologists who have professionally evaluated the question and reached a unanimous decision?

== Creationism ==
Shute was a Christian and old earth creationist who authored the book Flaws in the Theory of Evolution, in 1966. Shute aimed for a wide audience and did not cite any Biblical passages in the book but made frequent references to the "Creator" and "Grand Designer". Tom McIver has noted that Shute "dismisses, the standard biological evidence for evolution, including embryological evidence, vestigial organs, serology (biochemistry), and biogeography. He argues that parasite life-cycles, mimicry, interdependence of species, instinct, social insects, and many other examples of extraordinary adaptations refute evolution." The National Center for Science Education has negatively reviewed the book for misrepresenting evidence for evolution from the fossil record and ignoring basic biological facts regarding species. The book was criticized for making non-scientific arguments for a Grand Designer.

== Selected publications ==
As Vere Jameson

- Moths After Midnight (1945)
- The Sultan Of Jobat (1947)
- Omar From Nishapur (1948)
- Where The Heron Stands (1949)
- Sky Painter (1951)
- The Trumpets Fade (1973)

As Evan Shute

- The Influence of Vitamin E on Vascular Disease (with Arthur B. Vogelsang, Floyd R. Skelton and Wilfrid E. Shute, 1948)
- Therapeutic Uses of Vitamin E (with Wilfrid E. Shute, 1953)
- Your Heart and Vitamin E (with Wilfrid E. Shute, 1956)
- Common Questions On Vitamin E and Their Answers (1961)
- Flaws in the Theory of Evolution (1966)
- The Heart and Vitamin E (1963, 1969)
- The Vitamin E Story: The Medical Memoirs of Evan Shute (with James C. M. Shute, 1985)

== See also ==
- Orthomolecular medicine
