= Holy Trinity Church, Tunstall =

Church in Tunstall, North Yorkshire

Coordinates: 54.357°N 1.668°W

The church, in 2018

Holy Trinity Church is an Anglican church in Tunstall, North Yorkshire, a village in England.

Tunstall lies in the parish of St Anne's Church, Catterick. The chapel of ease in the village was built in 1847, to an Early English design by J. B. and W. Atkinson. The building was grade II listed in 1969.

The church is built of stone with a Welsh slate roof. It consists of a nave, and a chancel with a north vestry. The windows are lancets with hood moulds. At the west end is an oculus, above which is a blind vesica flanked by corbelled buttresses, and an infilled bellcote. Inside, there are boards with the Ten Commandments, Lord's Prayer and creed.

== See also ==
- Listed buildings in Tunstall, North Yorkshire
