= Tunstall, North Yorkshire =

Village and civil parish in North Yorkshire, England

Coordinates: 54.35969°N 1.6703°W

Tunstall
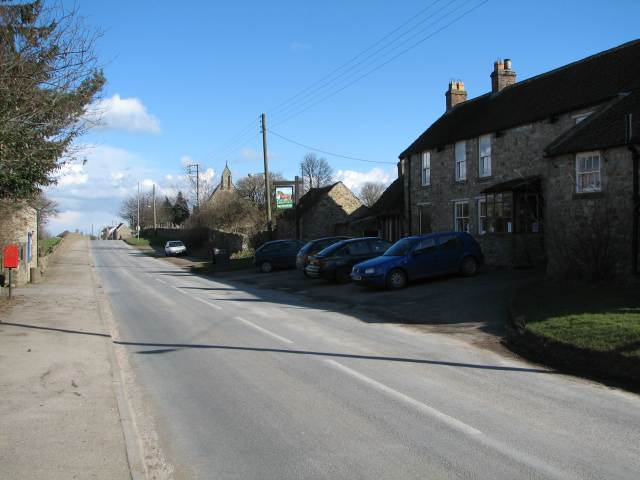
- Tunstall

- Location within North Yorkshire
- Population: 271 (2011 census)
- Unitary authority: North Yorkshire
- Ceremonial county: North Yorkshire
- Region: Yorkshire and the Humber
- Country: England
- Sovereign state: United Kingdom
- Post town: Richmond
- Postcode district: DL10
- Police: North Yorkshire
- Fire: North Yorkshire
- Ambulance: Yorkshire
- UK Parliament: Richmond and Northallerton

Tunstall is a village and civil parish in the county of North Yorkshire, England about 2 miles (3.2 km) west of Catterick Village and the A1(M) motorway. It had a population of 253 increasing to 271 at the 2011 census.

== History ==
The name Tunstall derives from the Old English tūnstall meaning 'farmstead'.

Tunstall was mentioned in the Domesday Book in 1096 as being in the hundred of "Land of Count Alan" and the county of Yorkshire, the population was estimated at 14.8 households.

In 1870-72 John Marius Wilson's Imperial Gazetteer of England and Wales described Tunstall as:

"a township-chapelry in Catterick parish, N. R. Yorkshire; 3 miles S of Catterick-Bridge r. station. Post town, Catterick. Acres, 1,262. Real property, £2,139. Pop., 293. Houses, 66. The living is annexed to Catterick. The church was built in 1847. There are a Wesleyan chapel and a slightly endowed school."

== Governance ==
The village lies within the Richmond and Northallerton parliamentary constituency, which is under the control of the Conservative Party. The current Member of Parliament, since the 2015 general election, is Rishi Sunak. From 1974 to 2023 it was part of the Hambleton District, it is now administered by the unitary North Yorkshire Council.

== Community and culture ==
Holy Trinity Church, Tunstall was built in 1846 as a chapel of ease to St Michael and All Angels in neighbouring Hudswell. The building was grade II listed in 1969. Tunstall has one public house, The Bay Horse, which is tied to the Yorkshire-based brewer Samuel Smith.

== Notable people ==
- Joseph Blacket (d. 1810), poet
- Harold D. Foster (1943–2009), geographer

== See also ==
- Listed buildings in Tunstall, North Yorkshire
