= Listed buildings in Tunstall, North Yorkshire =

Tunstall is a civil parish in the county of North Yorkshire, England. It contains two listed buildings that are recorded in the National Heritage List for England. Both the listed buildings are designated at Grade II, the lowest of the three grades, which is applied to "buildings of national importance and special interest". The parish contains the village of Tunstall and the surrounding countryside, and the listed buildings consist of a church and a former estate lodge.

== Buildings ==
Name and location	Photograph	Date	Notes
Holy Trinity Church; 54.35729°N 1.66859°W		1847	The church is in stone with a Welsh slate roof, and is in Early English style. It consists of a nave, and a chancel with a north vestry. The windows are lancets with hood moulds. At the west end is an oculus, above which is a blind vesica flanked by corbelled buttresses, and an infilled bellcote.
Rosemary Cottage; 54.36817°N 1.66934°W	—	Early to mid-19th century	Originally a lodge to Brough Hall, it is in stone on a plinth, with chamfered rusticated quoins, oversailing eaves and a hipped Westmorland slate roof. There is a single storey, a square plan and three bays. The central doorway has an architrave, the windows are sashes with chamfered surrounds, and all the openings have hood moulds.
