= Food for the Brain Foundation =

The Food for the Brain Foundation is a non-profit educational campaign, claiming to have been created by a group of nutritionists, doctors, psychiatrists, psychologists, teachers and scientists to promote a purported link between nutrition and mental health. It is an initiative led by the author and entrepreneur Patrick Holford.

The foundation has received publicity with its pilot study in a number of British schools that has attempted to improve children's performance by improving nutrition. The campaign has been both lauded as revealing a massive improvement in pupils' behaviour and performances and criticised as unscientific and encouraging fad diets.

== Schools campaign ==
The best known and launching campaign of the Food for the Brain Foundation was a pilot study carried out at Cricket Green special education school in Merton, London. This study lasted seven months and had pupils following "a daily regime of taking the long chain fatty acid supplement "eye q", a combination of omega-3 fish oil and omega-6 evening primrose oil, a balanced nutritious diet, a new exercise regime, and a multivitamin." The study "transformed" the behaviour of children at the school, with a 25% drop in psychosomatic problems reported. A similar study, followed by the ITV current affairs programme Tonight with Trevor MacDonald, is underway at Chineham Park school Basingstoke. This has been described as "phenomenally successful", with children's behaviour notably improving.

However, the studies have also been criticised. Catherine Collins of St George's Hospital in London stated that a pupil in the Merton study had "suffered sleep problems and her weight dropped as a result of the advice [Mr Holford] gave." The study has been criticised as being unscientific, with results "cherry-picked" and the effects merely a "placebo". Holford and the foundation reject some of these allegations. Holford claims that the pupil in the Merton study has since regained the lost weight, which he puts down to a reduction in her gluten intake, after tests revealed she was "gluten sensitive". He states that her overall behaviour and health have improved during the study.

== Universities ==
The foundation provides accreditation for catering at some universities.
