= Claus W. Jungeblut =

American bacteriologist

- Born: June 12, 1897; Saint Paul, Minnesota
- Died: February 1, 1976 (aged 78); Westport, Connecticut
- Occupation: Bacteriologist

Claus Washington Jungeblut (June 12, 1897 – February 1, 1976) was an American bacteriologist and vitamin researcher.

== Biography ==
Jungeblut was born in Saint Paul, Minnesota to Nicholas and Gertrude Jungeblut. He was educated at University of Bern where he obtained his M.D. in 1921. He was an assistant at Robert Koch Institute (1921–1922).

He was a bacteriologist at the New York State Department of Health, an associate professor at Stanford University (1927–1929), and Professor of bacteriology at Columbia University (1929–1962). He was research consultant on microbiology at Lenox Hill Hospital (1962–1970). He was known for his research on infantile paralysis.

Jungeblut married June Magor Beckwith in 1951.

Jungeblut died age 78 in Westport, Connecticut.

== Vitamin C therapy ==
In the 1930s, Jungeblut conducted some of the first experiments on vitamin C therapy (megavitamin therapy). His experiments were done on monkeys infected with poliomyelitis. He concluded "that under certain restricted experimental conditions, vitamin C is capable of influencing favorably the course of the infection in monkeys." Albert Sabin was unable to replicate Jungeblut's results.

== Selected publications ==
- Inactivation of Poliomyelitis Virus in Vitro by Crystalline Vitamin C (Ascorbic Acid) (1935)
- Vitamin C Therapy and Prophylaxis in Experimental Poliomyelitis (1937)
- A Further Contribution to Vitamin C Therapy in Experimental Poliomyelitis (1939)
- Studies on the Inactivation of Diphtheria Toxin by Vitamin C (I-Ascorbic Acid) (1941)
