= Ministry of Health (Saskatchewan) =

- Le ministère de la Santé

Organization overview
- Ministers responsible: Jeremy Cockrill, Minister of Health; Everett Hindley, Minister Responsible for Rural and Remote Health
- Deputy Minister responsible: Max Hendricks
- Parent Organization: Government of Saskatchewan
- Website: www.saskatchewan.ca

The Ministry of Health in Saskatchewan is responsible for policy direction, sets and monitors standards, and provides funding for regional health authorities and provincial health services.
