= Journal of Orthomolecular Medicine =

- Discipline: Alternative and traditional medicine
- Language: English

Publication details
- Former names: Journal of Orthomolecular Psychiatry; Orthomolecular Psychiatry
- History: 1967–present
- Frequency: Quarterly

Standard abbreviations
- ISO 4: J. Orthomol. Med.

Indexing
- CODEN: JORMEI
- ISSN: 0834-4825
- OCLC no.: 15726974

Links
- Journal homepage

The Journal of Orthomolecular Medicine was established in 1967 by Abram Hoffer. It publishes studies in nutritional and orthomolecular medicine. There is controversy surrounding the journal, as the validity of the field of orthomolecular medicine is not widely accepted by mainstream medicine. The journal is ranked in the bottom 10 percent of all journals about complementary and alternative medicine that are indexed in the bibliographic database Scopus (#74 out of 82 journals; CiteScore 2018).

== History ==
In 1967, Hoffer found it increasingly difficult to publish reports on his studies of megavitamin therapies and claimed that his studies were rejected in a conspiracy of mainstream medicine, prompted by what he alleged to be extended conflicts of interest on the part of the American Psychiatric Association. The Journal of Schizophrenia followed the formation of the Canadian Schizophrenia Foundation and the American Schizophrenia Association. Hoffer and Humphry Osmond, who developed the hypothesis that schizophrenia is caused by the endogenous production of an epinephrine (adrenaline)-based hallucinogen, were called before the Committee of Ethics of the American Psychiatric Association to explain why they were publicizing a treatment, called xenobiotic psychiatry by Bernard Rimland, which was considered outside of standard psychiatric practice. Hoffer claims that one of the assistant editors of the American Journal of Psychiatry announced that he would never allow any article from Hoffer's group to appear in his journal.

Several name changes occurred: to Schizophrenia; then to Orthomolecular Psychiatry, ostensibly to reflect the increased application of this type of therapy to other mental illnesses; then to Journal of Orthomolecular Medicine.

== Controversial status ==
The Journal of Orthomolecular Medicine is not indexed by MEDLINE, a database of biomedical literature. Journals are selected for MEDLINE by the National Library of Medicine based on scope and coverage, quality of content, quality of editorial work, intended audience, quality of the layout, printing, graphics, and illustrations. The journal is classified as a "Non-recommended Periodical" by the alternative medicine watchdog website, Quackwatch.org.
