= Institute for Health Freedom =

- Abbreviation: IHF
- Dissolved: November 18, 2010
- Type: nonprofit organization
- Location: Washington, D.C.
- Key people: Sue A. Blevins (President)
- Website: www.forhealthfreedom.org

The Institute for Health Freedom (IHF) was a nonprofit organization based in Washington, D.C. IHF monitored and reported on national policies that were perceived as affecting citizens' freedom to choose health-care treatments and providers, and sought to bolster health privacy. The president of the IHF was Sue A. Blevins, a former nurse. The IHF was disbanded on November 18, 2010.

== Issues and ideology ==
Issues promoted by the IHF included its opposition to the sharing of genetic information without patient consent, its belief that citizens should have greater privacy and control over their health information, and its belief that people should be free to choose not to participate in a national electronic health-records system. Blevins argued that the "ease of access and transferring of records electronically makes it easier to invade privacy" and that the monitoring of diabetics without patients' consent is "a recipe for invasion of privacy." She also criticised a health bill that could allow government access to personal financial records and other information, saying that it could lead to patients being less honest with their doctors in an effort to protect their medical privacy.

Blevins has also expressed concern about new ways in which health records are used, saying that customers should be notified when their health information is transferred. Following the passing of the American Recovery and Reinvestment Act of 2009, Blevins, on behalf of the Institute, argued that the economic stimulus law's plans for every American to use an electronic health record and to allow those records to be sold for research and public-health purposes without patients' consent weakens individuals' control over the flow of their personal health information. Speaking at a press conference sponsored by the Institute in 2002, Blevins said that people in the United States "will soon have to choose between health care and privacy."

== See also ==
- Health freedom movement
