= Carl Pfeiffer (pharmacologist) =

American physician and biochemist

Carl Curt Pfeiffer (March 19, 1908 – November 18, 1988) was a physician and biochemist who researched schizophrenia, allergies and other diseases. He was Chair of the Pharmacology Department at Emory University.

== Biography ==
Pfeiffer was native of Peoria, Illinois, and obtained his bachelor's degree and doctorate in pharmacology from University of Wisconsin and medical degree from University of Chicago. He has written several books on nutrition, trace metals, and biochemistry imbalances.

In 1977, it was revealed that Pfeiffer was one of the researchers involved in behavior experiments for the Central Intelligence Agency. Until the 1970s, under the project titled MKUltra; he administered LSD to inmates in the Atlanta penitentiary and in New Jersey Bordentown Reformatory.

Pfeiffer was interested in trace element and mineral metabolism in schizophrenia and what is now known as bipolar disorder and investigated the therapeutic uses of amino acids in various illnesses. Pfeiffer and co-workers reported that about a third of all the patients they examined had very high basophil counts, very high blood histamine levels and anomalies in their trace metal levels. Pfeiffer collaborated with Abram Hoffer. Pfeiffer founded the Princeton Brain-Bio Center, an outpatient treatment facility specializing Orthomolecular Psychiatry and Medicine. Pfeiffer also helped supervise, a residential treatment facility in Skillman, NJ known as the Earth House which was founded by one of Pfeiffer's recovered schizophrenic patients—Rosalind LaRoche who dedicated herself to supporting to Pfeiffer and Nutritional/Orthomolecular medicine.

Pfeiffer argued that "For every drug that benefits a patient, there is a natural substance that can achieve the same effect." Pfeiffer believed that biochemical imbalances were responsible for many psychological problems. After studying more than 20,000 schizophrenic patients, divided schizophrenia into three biochemical groups: Histapenia, Histadelia, and Pyroluria.

Of all the disorders he studied, Pfeiffer was focused intently on Schizophrenia. He used the terms: the waste basket diagnosis, the plague of mental disease, demon possession and insanity. He felt the word schizophrenia was an inadequate and misleading diagnosis. He believed that "disperceptions of unknown cause" was a more appropriate definition. In his book, 'Twenty-Nine Medical Causes of Schizophrenia', he gives a comprehensive list of medical causes of schizophrenia broken down into three categories: well-known, less-known, and almost unknown.

Pfeiffer suggested that most depressed people were born with a predisposition for depression, but that biochemical treatment would help overcome depression.

Pfeiffer conducted a 12-year study which allowed him to classify behavior disorders into four categories based on trace metal patterns. Type A: high copper/zinc ratio, depressed hair sodium, potassium and lead sensitivity. These individuals exhibit episodes of fighting, oppositional behavior and mood swings. Type B: depressed hair copper, pyroluria, elevated histamine and elevated toxic metals. They exhibit assaultive behavior, absence of remorse, pathological lying, fascination with fire and cruelty towards animals. Type C: "mal absorbers", tend to be slender, usually impulsive and oppositional. Type D: depressed manganese and chromium levels. They exhibit nonviolent delinquent behavior.

Carl Pfeiffer died at the age of 80 at the Princeton Brain Bio Center. He had had a heart attack.

== Bibliography ==
- Pfeiffer C (1988). Nutrition and Mental Illness : An Orthomolecular Approach to Balancing Body Chemistry. Healing Arts Press. ISBN 0-89281-226-5.
- Pfeiffer C (January 1976). Mental and Elemental Nutrients: A Physician's Guide to Nutrition and Health Care. Keats Pub. ISBN 0-87983-114-6.
- Pfeiffer, Carl C. Ph.D., M.D. and Scott LaMola, B.S. Zinc and Manganese in the Schizophrenias First published in Journal of Orthomolecular Psychiatry, Vol. 12, No. 3, 1983
