= Health freedom movement =

Libertarian coalition that opposes regulation of health practices

The health freedom movement is a libertarian coalition that opposes regulation of health practices and advocates for increased access to "non-traditional" health care.

The John Birch Society has been a prominent advocate for health freedom since at least the 1970s, and the specific term "health freedom movement" has been used in the United States since the 1990s.

Vitamins and supplements have been exempted in the US from regulations requiring evidence of safety and efficacy, largely due to the activism of health freedom advocates. The idea that supplements and vitamins can demonstrably improve health or longevity and that there are no negative consequences from their use, is not widely accepted in the medical community. Very rarely, large doses of some vitamins lead to vitamin poisoning (hypervitaminosis).

== Roots and support base ==
Health freedom is a libertarian position not aligned to the conventional left/right political axis. Libertarian Republican Congressman Ron Paul introduced the Health Freedom Protection Act in the U.S. House of Representatives in 2005.

Prominent celebrity supporters of the movement include the musician Sir Paul McCartney, who says that people "have a right to buy legitimate health food supplements" and that "this right is now clearly under threat," and the pop star/actress Billie Piper, who joined a march in London in 2003 to protest planned EU legislation to ban high dosage vitamin supplements.

== Legislation ==
=== United States ===
The Dietary Supplement Health and Education Act of 1994 (DSHEA) defines supplements as foods and thus permits marketing unless the United States Food and Drug Administration (FDA) proves that it poses significant or unreasonable risk of harm rather than requiring the manufacturer to prove the supplement’s safety or efficacy. The Food and Drug Administration can take action only if the producers make medical claims about their products or if consumers of the products become seriously ill.

An October 2002 nationwide Harris poll showed that, at that time, consumers still had widespread confusion about the differences between supplements and pharmaceuticals. Here, 59% of respondents assumed that supplements had to be approved by a government agency before they could be marketed; 68% assumed that supplements had to list potential side effects on their labels; and 55% assumed that supplement labels could not make claims of safety without scientific evidence. All of these assumptions are incorrect as a result of provisions of the DSHEA.

A law in the U.S. State of Virginia allows teenagers 14 or older and their parents the right to refuse medical treatments for ailments such as cancer, and to seek alternative treatments so long as they have considered all other medical options, presented as "significant for health freedom in Virginia."

=== Europe ===
In Europe, health freedom movement writers and campaigners think that European Union (EU) laws such as the Food Supplements Directive and the Human Medicinal Products (Pharmaceuticals) Directive will reduce their access to food supplements and herbal "medicines". European health food producers, retailers and consumers have been vocal in protesting against this legislation, with the health freedom movement inviting supporters to "Stop Brussels from killing natural medicine". Euro-MPs were accosted by activists handing out a propaganda video accusing five European commissioners of corruptly colluding with big pharmaceutical firms in an attempt to destroy the alternative network of homeopathic and "natural medicines", though it emerged that most homeopathic practice in the UK has been illegal for some years and proposed European regulatory changes do not materially affect this.

In 2004, the Alliance for Natural Health (ANH) and two British trade associations introduced a legal challenge to the Food Supplements Directive referred to the European Court of Justice by the High Court in London. European judges found the restrictions to be legal but stated that there must be clear procedures to allow substances to be added to the permitted list based on scientific evidence. They also said that any refusal to add a product to the list must be open to challenge in the courts.

== Views on supplement legislation ==
Health freedom-orientated writers and campaigners tend to see restrictive legislation on supplements as being designed to protect the interests of the pharmaceutical industry. If herbal medicines and supplements are removed from sale, they argue, patients will have no alternative but to use conventional pharmaceutical medicines.

Pharmacist and writer Scott Gavura notes that the reverse is more often true, and that "governments around the world have consistently given manufacturers the upper hand, prioritizing a company’s desire to sell a product over a consumer’s right to a marketplace with safe, effective products". In particular, the US Dietary Supplement Health and Education Act permitted existing supplements to be marketed without any evidence that they are effective or safe, and for new supplement ingredients required only that a new ingredient "should be safe". This has resulted in a number of serious incidents including adulteration with synthetic drugs.

=== Opposition to Codex Alimentarius guidelines ===
The health-freedom movement vehemently opposes the Guidelines for Vitamin and Mineral Food Supplements, adopted by the Codex Alimentarius Commission as a voluntary standard at its meeting in Rome in July 2005, which includes requirements for the packaging and labelling of vitamin and mineral supplements. The text specifies that "supplements should contain vitamins/provitamins and minerals whose nutritional value for human beings has been proven by scientific data and whose status as vitamins and minerals is recognised by FAO and WHO." In addition, it states that the "sources of vitamins and minerals may be either natural or synthetic" and that "their selection should be based on considerations such as safety and bioavailability."

The United Nations' Food and Agriculture Organization (FAO) and World Health Organization (WHO) have stated that the guidelines are a consumer protection measure "to stop consumers overdosing on vitamin and mineral food supplements." The Codex Alimentarius Commission (CAC) has said that the guidelines call "for labelling that contains information on maximum consumption levels of vitamin and mineral food supplements." The WHO has also said that the Guidelines "ensure that consumers receive beneficial health effects from vitamins and minerals."

== Organizations and campaigners ==
=== The Americas ===
The National Health Federation (NHF) is an international non-profit organization founded in January 1955, which describes its mission as protecting individuals' rights to use dietary supplements and alternative therapies without government restriction. The NHF also opposes interventions such as water fluoridation and childhood vaccines. The Federation has official observer status at meetings of the Codex Alimentarius Commission, the highest international body on food standards. Based in California, the Federation's board members include medical doctors, scientists, therapists and consumer advocates of natural health; and it is the only health-freedom organization with Codex credentials permitting it to participate actively at Codex Alimentarius meetings.

=== Europe ===
The Alliance for Natural Health (ANH) is an advocacy group founded in 2002 by Robert Verkerk and based in the United Kingdom. The ANH was initially founded to raise funds to finance a legal challenge of the EU Food Supplement Directive. The ANH lobbies against regulation of dietary supplements and in favor of alternative medical approaches such as homeopathy, and also advocates a healthy diet, exercise, and other lifestyle approaches to health. Verkerk rejects scientific research showing that megadoses of vitamins lack any health benefit.

=== Individual campaigners ===
The health freedom movement includes proponents such as Gary Null and convicted fraudster Kevin Trudeau.

== See also ==
- Codex Alimentarius
- Institute for Health Freedom, a defunct US advocacy group
- Megavitamin therapy
- Naturopathic medicine
- Orthomolecular medicine
- Abortion-rights movements
