= André Tylee =

André Tylee (born 1955) holds the Emeritus Chair of Primary Care Mental Health at the Institute of Psychiatry, Psychology and Neuroscience, King's College London. He used to oversee the primary care research program for the Institute and for the Maudsley Hospital in London, before retirement from the post of Academic Director for Mood and Personality Disorders at Kings Health Partners. He was a general practitioner from 1980-2001 in Sutton, Surrey, his main research interest was the recognition and management of clinical depression and anxiety in primary care, particularly in those with coronary heart disease, running a National Institute for Health and Care Research (NIHR) funded research programme named UPBEAT.

Tylee held a national mental health leadership fellowship for the RCGP, Mental Health Foundation and Department of Health in the early 1990s and helped represent the RCGP on the Defeat Depression Campaign with the Royal College of Psychiatrists who led the 5 year national campaign to educate the public and professionals about depression. At the same time he co-founded "Trailblazers," a nationwide training and leadership program in which general practitioners, nurses, and other primary care workers join a partner from a specialist mental health team to work on a project to improve their local mental health services. The program had over 600 graduates in England and was extended to the U.S., Australia, and New Zealand., funded by IIMHL and led by Dr Anand Chitnis.
