= Abram Hoffer =

Canadian biochemist

- Born: November 11, 1917; Sonnenfeld, Saskatchewan, Canada
- Died: May 27, 2009 (aged 91); Victoria, British Columbia, Canada
- Education: University of Saskatchewan; University of Minnesota; University of Toronto
- Known for: Promotion of orthomolecular therapy as a treatment for schizophrenia
- Scientific career
- Fields: Schizophrenia, Nutrition, Alcoholism
- Workplaces: Saskatchewan Department of Public Health; University of Saskatchewan

Abram Hoffer (November 11, 1917 – May 27, 2009) was a Canadian biochemist, physician, and psychiatrist known for his "adrenochrome hypothesis" of schizoaffective disorders. According to Hoffer, megavitamin therapy and other nutritional interventions are potentially effective treatments for cancer and schizophrenia. Hoffer was also involved in studies of LSD as an experimental therapy for alcoholism and the discovery that high-dose niacin can be used to treat high cholesterol and other dyslipidemias.

== Biography ==
Hoffer was born in the small Jewish settlement of Sonnenfeld in southern Saskatchewan, Canada, in 1917, the last of four children and the son of Israel Hoffer. Originally interested in agriculture, Hoffer earned both a bachelor's and a master's degree in agricultural chemistry from the University of Saskatchewan in Saskatoon. He then took up a scholarship for a year of post-graduate work with the University of Minnesota, followed by work developing assays for niacin levels at a wheat products laboratory in Winnipeg. Hoffer earned a PhD in biochemistry in 1944, part of which involved the study of vitamins (particularly B vitamins and their effect on the body) and with an interest in nutrition went on to study medicine at the University of Manitoba in 1945. After two years of clinical work at the University of Toronto, Hoffer earned his MD in 1949. Though originally intending to be a general practitioner, during his studies Hoffer developed an interest in psychiatry. He married Rose Miller in 1942, and his son Bill Hoffer was born in 1944 followed by two more children, John and Miriam, in 1947 and 1949.

Hoffer was hired by the Saskatchewan Department of Public Health in 1950 to establish a provincial research program in psychiatry, and joined the Regina Psychiatric Services Branch, Department of Public Health in 1951. He remained the Director of Psychiatric Research until entering private practice in 1967. Critical of psychiatry for its emphasis on psychosomatic psychoanalysis and for what he considered a lack of adequate definition and measurement, Hoffer felt that biochemistry and human physiology may be used instead. He hypothesised that people with schizophrenia may lack the ability to remove the hallucinogenic catecholamine metabolite adrenochrome from their brains. Hoffer thought niacin could be used as a methyl acceptor to prevent the conversion of noradrenaline into adrenaline and that Vitamin C could be used to prevent the oxidation of Adrenaline to Adrenochrome. Hoffer called his theory the "adrenochrome hypothesis".

In 1967, Hoffer resigned some of his academic and administrative positions, entered into private psychiatric practice in Saskatoon, Saskatchewan and created the Journal of Schizophrenia (renamed the Journal of Orthomolecular Medicine in 1986). Hoffer used the journal to publish articles on what he called "nutritional psychiatry", later orthomolecular psychiatry, claiming his ideas were consistently rejected by mainstream journals because they were unacceptable to the medical establishment. In 1976, Hoffer relocated to Victoria, British Columbia and continued with his private psychiatric practice until his retirement in 2005. In 1994, Hoffer founded the International Society for Orthomolecular Medicine, holding its inaugural in Vancouver in April of the same year. Hoffer continued to provide nutritional consultations and served as editor of the Journal of Orthomolecular Medicine. He was also President of the Orthomolecular Vitamin Information Centre in Victoria, BC.

Hoffer died at the age of 91 on May 27, 2009, in Victoria, British Columbia, Canada. His remains were buried in the Jewish Cemetery of Victoria.

== Research ==
Working in Saskatchewan with Humphry Osmond (who coined the term "psychedelic"), Hoffer and other scientists sought to find medicinal uses for hallucinogenic drugs. Part of the research involved Hoffer, Osmond and their wives consuming LSD in an effort to become better acquainted with, and better understand its effects, later joined by other experimenters and their wives. Their work began attracting notoriety within professional, provincial and federal and political circles, and they were courted by the emerging movement to restrict peyote as well as Native American groups that used the substance in religious ceremonies. Hoffer, Osmond and others treated alcoholics with LSD. Canadian scientists reported a fifty percent success rate in one study, although Hoffer speculated that it was more likely the psychedelic experience of LSD, rather than simulated delirium tremens, that convinced the alcoholics to stop drinking.

While working at the Regina General Hospital in the 1950s, Hoffer and James Stephen examined the effects of large doses of niacin on various diseases, including schizophrenia; Hoffer theorized that adrenalin, when oxidized to adrenochrome was an endogenous neurotoxin that could cause schizophrenia. At the same time, another Canadian working in Saskatoon, pathologist Rudolf Altschul, was exploring the use of high doses of niacin to lower cholesterol in rabbits and patients with degenerative vascular disease. The three combined their work, and in 1955 produced a paper entitled "Influence of nicotinic acid on serum cholesterol in man." The paper summarized their research showing high-dose niacin significantly lowered cholesterol in both high cholesterol patients as well as low cholesterol control subjects. The results were replicated by researchers at the Mayo Clinic and in Germany the following year. High-dose niacin has since become a treatment option for individuals with high blood cholesterol and related blood lipid abnormalities.

At such high doses niacin acts like a drug rather than a vitamin and may have side effects of intense flushing of the face and torso and, rarely, liver toxicity. Hoffer continued to promote niacin as a treatment for schizophrenia, though this approach was not accepted by mainstream medicine. Subsequent research suggested that Hoffer's adrenochrome theory had merit as people with schizophrenia have defects in the genes that produce glutathione S-transferase, which eliminates the byproducts of catecholamines from the brain. Though Hoffer and Osmond reported nicotinic acid could help with the treatment of schizophrenia, others reported that they could not replicate these results. Despite the apparent face validity of Hoffer's "transmethylation hypothesis" (in which it was thought that the production of catecholamines could sometimes go awry and produce a hallucinogenic neurotoxin), it was ultimately rejected for two reasons: the alleged neurotoxins were never identified and the cause of schizophrenia became attributed to dysfunctions in neurotransmitters.

== Controversy ==
Hoffer's claims regarding schizophrenia and his theories of holistic orthomolecular medicine have been criticized by the mainstream of psychiatry. In 1973, the American Psychiatric Association reported methodological flaws in Hoffer's work on niacin as a schizophrenia treatment and referred to follow-up studies that did not confirm any benefits of the treatment, prompting at least two responses.

Multiple additional studies in the United States, Canada, and Australia similarly failed to find benefits of megavitamin therapy to treat schizophrenia. The term "orthomolecular" was labeled a misnomer as early as 1973. Psychiatrist and critic of psychiatry Thomas Szasz, author of The Myth of Mental Illness (1961), believed Hoffer's view of schizophrenia as a physical disease treatable with vitamins and self-help therapy to be "pure quackery".

== Publications ==
- Chemical Basis of Clinical Psychiatry, with Humphry Osmond. Springfield, IL: Thomas, 1960. OCLC 631787.
- Niacin Therapy in Psychiatry. Springfield, IL: Thomas, 1962. OCLC 1629909.
- How to Live With Schizophrenia. New Hyde Park, NY: University Books, 1966.
- New Hope for Alcoholics. Hyde Park, NY: University Books, 1966.
- Abram Hoffer; Humphrey Osmond (1967). The Hallucinogens. Elsevier. doi:10.1016/c2013-0-12543-3. ISBN 978-1-4832-3296-6. LCCN 66030086. OCLC 332437. OL 35255701M.
- Hoffer-Osmond Diagnostic Test, with Humphry Osmond and Kelm H. Tuscaloosa, AL: Behavior Science Press, 1975.
- Megavitamin Therapy: In Reply to the American Psychiatric Association Task Force Report on Megavitamins and Orthomolecular Psychiatry. Regina, Saskatchewan: Canadian Schizophrenia Foundation, 1976.
- Nutrients to Age Without Senility, with Morton Walker and Roger J. Williams. Keats Pub, Inc., 1980. ISBN 0879832185.
- Orthomolecular medicine for physicians. McGraw-Hill Trade, 1989. ISBN 0879833904.
- How to Live with Schizophrenia. Carol Publishing Group, 1992. ISBN 9780806506654.
- Hoffer's Laws of Natural Nutrition: A Guide to Eating Well for Pure Health. Quarry Press, 1996. ISBN 1550820958.
- Vitamin B-3 and Schizophrenia: Discovery, Recovery, Controversy. Quarry Press, 1996. ISBN 1550820796.
- Hoffer, Abram; Walker, Morton; Hoffer, Abram (1996). Putting it all together : the new orthomolecular nutrition. New Canaan, Conn.: Keats Pub. ISBN 0-87983-633-4. OCLC 34515814.
- Orthomolecular Treatment for Schizophrenia, McGraw-Hill Education, 1999. ISBN 9780879839109.
- Dr. Hoffer's ABC of Natural Nutrition for Children: With Learning Disabilities, Behavioral Disorders, and Mental State Dysfunctions, Quarry Press, 1999. ISBN 1550821857.
- Healing Cancer: Complementary Vitamin & Drug Treatments. CCNM Press, 2004. ISBN 1897025114.
- User's Guide to Natural Therapies for Cancer Prevention & Control: Learn How Diet and Supplements Can Help Prevent and Treat Cancer. Basic Health Publications, Inc., 2004. ISBN 1591201365.
- Naturopathic Nutrition, with Jonathan Prousky. Canadian College of Naturopathic Medicine Press, 2006. ISBN 9781897025154.
- Feel Better, Live Longer with Vitamin B-3: Nutrient Deficiency and Dependency, with Harold D. Foster. CCNM Press, 2007. ISBN 1897025246.
- Orthomolecular Medicine For Everyone, with Andrew W. Saul. Laguna Beach, CA: Basic Health, 2008. ISBN 978-1591202264.
- The Vitamin Cure for Alcoholism: Orthomolecular Treatment of Addictions. Basic Health Publications, Inc., 2009. ISBN 9781591202547.
- Psychiatry Yesterday (1950) and Today (2007): From Despair to Hope with Orthomolecular Psychiatry. Trafford Publishing, 2009. ISBN 1425155839.
- Hospitals and Health: Your Orthomolecular Guide to a Shorter, Safer Hospital Stay, with Andrew W. Saul and Steve Hickey. Basic Health Publications, Inc., 2010. ISBN 1591202604.
- Healing Schizophrenia: Complementary Vitamin & Drug Treatments (Naturopathic Healing Series, Professional Edition). CCNM Press, 2011. ISBN 1897025394.
- Niacin: The Real Story: Learn about the Wonderful Healing Properties of Niacin, with Andrew W. Saul and Harold D. Foster. Basic Health Publications, Inc., 2015. ISBN 1681627566.
- Healing Children's Attention and Behavior Disorders: Complementary Nutritional & Psychological Treatments. CCNM Press, 2015. ISBN 1897025106.
