= Gabriel Anton =

Austrian neurologist and psychiatrist

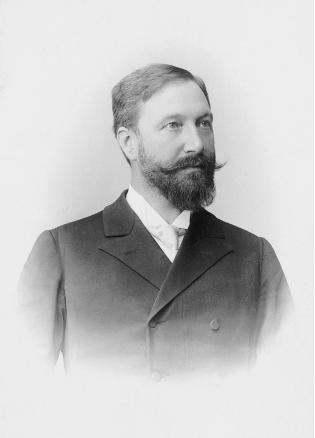
Anton, c. 1890

Gabriel Anton (28 July 1858 – 3 January 1933) was an Austrian neurologist and psychiatrist. He is primarily remembered for his studies of psychiatric conditions arising from damage to the cerebral cortex and the basal ganglia.

== Academic career ==
He was a native of Saaz, Bohemia, and in 1882 received his medical doctorate at Prague. In 1887 he traveled to Vienna in order to work with Theodor Meynert (1833–1892), who was to become an important influence to Anton's medical career. In 1891 he moved to Innsbruck, where he served as an associate professor of psychiatry and director of the university clinic. Later (1894), he relocated to the University of Graz as a full professor of psychiatry, and in 1905 succeeded Karl Wernicke (1848–1905) at the University of Halle.

== Contributions ==
Anton is remembered for his pioneer contributions in the field of neurosurgery. In collaboration with surgeons Friedrich Gustav von Bramann (1854–1913) and Viktor Schmieden (1874–1945), he proposed new procedures for treatment of hydrocephalus. These included the "Balkenstich method" and the "suboccipital puncture".

Along with neurologist Joseph Babinski (1857–1932), the Anton–Babinski syndrome is named. Anton provided a detailed description and explanation of visual anosognosia and asomatoagnosia associated with the disorder. Asomatoagnosia is a rare phenomenon where a patient is in denial of a body part.

With Paul Ferdinand Schilder (1886–1940), he performed investigations of movements in patients with chorea and athetosis. In his research of chorea, he identified scars in the lenticular nuclei.

== Decorations and awards ==
- Iron Cross, 2nd class
- Red Cross Medal, 3rd class
- Member of the German Academy of Sciences Leopoldina (1911)
- Professor emeritus (1926)

== Selected publications ==
- Störungen im Oberflächenwachstum des menschlichen Grosshirns. Zeitschrift für Heilkunde, Prague, 1888.
- Hydrocephalus und Gehirndruck. Medizinische Jahrbücher, Vienna, 1889. - Hydrocephalus and "brain pressure".
- Über angeborene Erkrankungen des Centralnervensystems, Vienna, 1890 - On congenital diseases of the central nervous system.
- Über die Selbstwahrnehmung der Herderkrankungen durch den Kranken bei Rindenblindheit und Rindentaubheit. In: Archiv für Psychiatrie und Nervenkrankheiten. Bd. 32. 1899, S. 86 - On the self-perception of focal lesions in patients with cortical blindness and cortical deafness.
- Über den Ausdruck der Gemütsbewegung beim gesunden und kranken Menschen. Psych Wschr, 1900; 2: 165–169. (Anton–Babinski syndrome)
- Vier Vorträge über Entwicklungsstörungen beim Kinde. Berlin, 1908. - Four lectures on developmental disorders in children.
- Über krankhafte moralische Abartung im Kindesalter und über den Heilwert der Affekte. with Fritz Gustav Bramann (1854–1913). Halle 1910.
- Behandlung der angeborenen und erworbenen Gehirnkrankheiten mit Hilfe des Balkenstiches. with Fritz Gustav Bramann. Berlin 1913. - Treatment of congenital and acquired diseases of the brain with the help of the Balkenstich.
