= ⚨ =

⚨ may refer to:

- Gender symbol for androgyny
- Alchemical symbol for iron(II) sulfate
