= Friedrich Gustav von Bramann =

German surgeon (1854–1913)

- Born: 25 September 1854; Wilhelmsburg, East Prussia
- Died: 21 April 1913 (aged 58)
- Burial place: Halle
- Education: University of Königsberg
- Occupation: Surgeon

Friedrich Gustav von Bramann (25 September 1854 – 21 April 1913) was a German surgeon born in Wilhelmsberg near Darkehmen, East Prussia.

He studied medicine at the University of Königsberg and joined the Corps Hansea. He became assistant surgeon to Ernst von Bergmann at the Charité in Berlin. In 1889 he declined the call to the University of Greifswald and became a senior lecturer at the Charité. In 1890 he was appointed professor (Ordinarius) of surgery at the University of Halle an der Saale, succeeding Richard von Volkmann

In 1887-88 he was attending surgeon to the Crown Prince Friedrich Wilhelm in San Remo. When Friedrich almost choked on a larynx cancer he encouraged Bramann to perform a tracheostomy. Bramann, known for his icy composure, did so and thus enabled the Prince to ascend to the throne in March 1888. When Friedrich died just three months later, the autopsy Bramann's emergency measure, disregarding the former assessment of Morell Mackenzie and Rudolf Virchow.

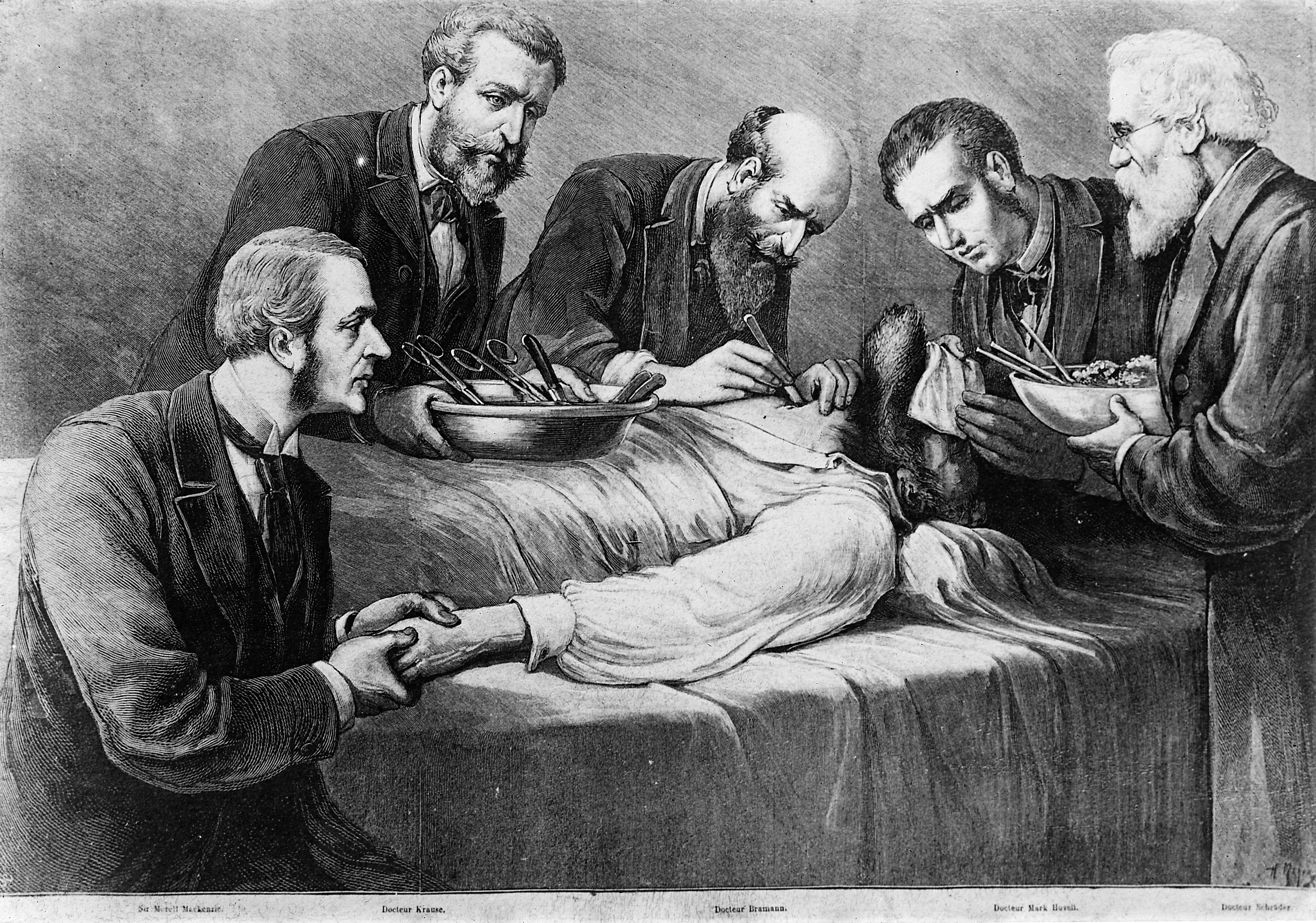
Operation on the throat of Kaiser Frederick III by Doctors Mackenzie, Krause, von Bramann (top middle), Hovell and Schrader

Bramann was known for his use of minimally invasive surgical practices and his pioneer work in neurosurgery. With neurologist Gabriel Anton, he researched suboccipital puncture and the "Balkenstich method" for treatment of hydrocephalus. The "Balkenstich method" was first introduced in 1908 by Bramann and Anton, and is a procedure in which the corpus callosum (a tract of white matter connecting the brain's two halves) is pierced for drainage of cerebrospinal fluid.

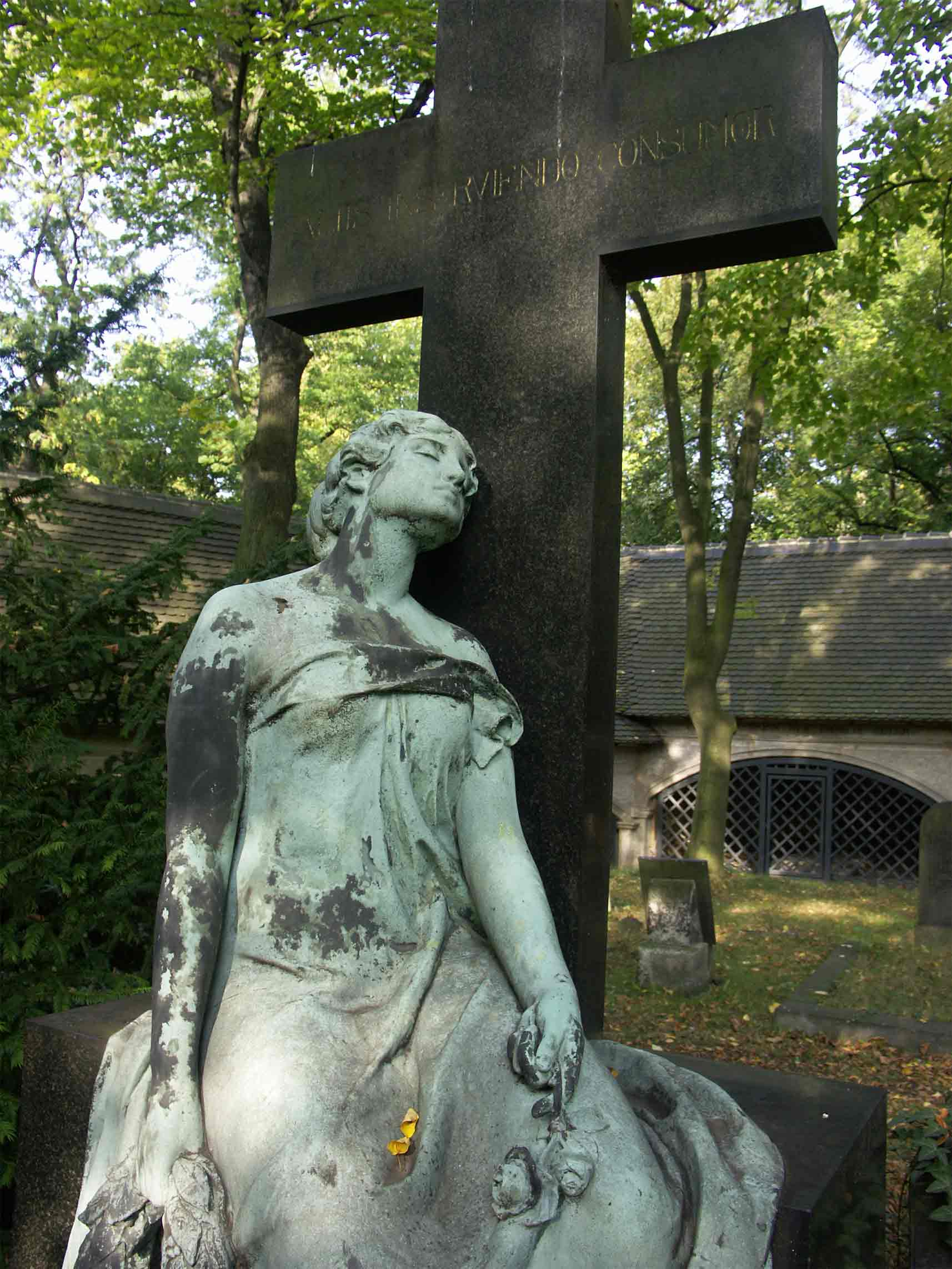
Bramann's grave in Halle

Bramann despised academic poly-writing and published only some dozens articles and papers.

He was knighted in 1891 and received high decorations for treating German princes and Turkish dignitaries.
