= Center for the Partially Sighted =

U.S. non-profit organization

The Center for the Partially Sighted is an American non-profit organization with the goal of promoting independent living for people with visual impairments. The center was founded in 1978 by Sam Genensky and two associates as an outreach program of the Santa Monica Hospital (now the Santa Monica – UCLA Medical Center).

The Center works with persons who have partial to profound vision loss as a result of macular degeneration, glaucoma, strokes, cataracts, complications of diabetes, retinitis pigmentosa, cortical visual impairment, retinopathy of prematurity, atrophy of the optic nerve, albinism, and eye injury. It provides several services to persons from these conditions, including optometric counseling, life counseling, rehabilitation assistance, and specialized programs such as residential visits to advise in making living areas more liveable.

The Center has five offices, all in California. The Main Office and Pasadena/Eagle Rock Office are in Los Angeles; the Valley Office is in Tarzana; the Central Coast Office is in San Luis Obispo; and the South Bay Office is in Torrance. With prior arrangements, language translators are available at these offices. The Los Angeles office serves about 2,300 persons per year.

The Center charges for its services, but reduces or eliminates the charge depending on a person's financial resources. It receives grants from government agencies and donations from private foundations. One such grant established the George and Reva Graziado Institute for Low Vision Education, a subsidiary of the Center. This Institute administers a Continuing Education Program, which provides Continuing Education Credits (CEU) on low-vision rehabilitation topics, and is approved for optometrists, psychologists, social workers, MFTs, nurses and other rehabilitation specialists. The Institute also administers a Low Vision Internship and Residency Program, which provides fourth-year internships to fourth-year optometry students from the Southern California College of Optometry (located in Fullerton, California). It also extends a residency invitation to an Optometry graduate each year.

== See also ==
- Low vision
