= Anton syndrome =

Rare symptom of brain damage where those affected deny being blind

- Other names: Anton–Babinski syndrome, visual anosognosia
- Specialty: Neurology
- Named after: Gabriel Anton

Anton syndrome, also known as Anton–Babinski syndrome and visual anosognosia, is a rare symptom of brain damage occurring in the occipital lobe. Those who have it are cortically blind, but affirm, often quite adamantly and in the face of clear evidence of their blindness, that they are capable of seeing. Failing to accept being blind, people with Anton syndrome dismiss evidence of their condition and employ confabulation to fill in the missing sensory input. The condition is named after the neurologist Gabriel Anton. Only 28 cases have been published.

== Presentation ==
Anton syndrome is mostly seen following a stroke, but may also be seen after head injury. Neurologist Macdonald Critchley describes it thus:

The sudden development of bilateral occipital dysfunction is likely to produce transient physical and psychological effects in which mental confusion may be prominent. It may be some days before the relatives, or the nursing staff, stumble onto the fact that the patient has actually become sightless. This is not only because the patient ordinarily does not volunteer the information that he has become blind, but he furthermore misleads his entourage by behaving and talking as though he were sighted. Attention is aroused however when the patient is found to collide with pieces of furniture, to fall over objects, and to experience difficulty in finding his way around. He may try to walk through a wall or through a closed door on his way from one room to another. Suspicion is still further alerted when he begins to describe people and objects around himself which, as a matter of fact, are not there at all.

Thus we have the twin symptoms of anosognosia (or lack of awareness of defect) and confabulation, the latter affecting both speech and behaviour.

Anton syndrome may be thought of ideally as the opposite of blindsight, blindsight occurring when there is degraded vision resulting in part of the visual field not consciously being experienced, but some reliable perception does in fact occur.

== Causes ==
It is not known why patients with Anton syndrome deny their blindness, although there are many theories. One hypothesis is that damage to the visual cortex results in the inability to communicate with the speech-language areas of the brain. Visual imagery is received but cannot be interpreted; the speech centers of the brain confabulate a response. Another possibility is that in Anton syndrome, lesions cause a disconnection between internal visual representations in visual association cortex, metacognitive processing in the cingulate cortex and memory-associated structures including the hippocampus. Anosognosia occurs because visual inputs cannot be meta-cognitively compared to priors stored in memory to recognize a deficit.

Patients have also reported visual anosognosia after experiencing ischemic vascular cerebral disease. A 96-year-old man, who was admitted to an emergency department complaining of a severe headache and sudden loss of vision, was discovered to have had a posterior cerebral artery thrombosis with consequent loss of vision. He adamantly claimed he was able to see despite an ophthalmologic exam proving otherwise. An MRI of his brain proved that his right occipital lobe was ischemic. Similarly, a 56-year-old woman was admitted to the emergency department in a confused state and with severely impaired psychomotor skills. Ocular movements and pupil reflexes were still intact, but the patient could not name objects and was not aware of light changes in the room, and seemed unaware of her visual deficit.

== Diagnosis ==
Though the patient is blind, they will behave and talk as if they have normal vision. Attention is aroused, however, when the patient is found to collide with pieces of furniture, to fall over objects, and to experience difficulty in finding their way around. They may try to walk through a wall or a closed door on their way from one room to another. Suspicion is still further alerted when they begin to describe people and objects around them who do not exist. Mental confusion may also be seen. Patients with ABS may give excuses for their blindness. They may explain that their inability to see is because of the lack of proper lighting, and they may try their best to prove that they are not blind, thereby putting themselves in danger. Differential diagnoses include: Cerebral visual impairment, delayed visual development, homonymous hemianopia, lack of facial recognition, visual agnosia, visual neglect, and visual perceptual disorder.

== History ==
Anton syndrome was first described in writing by Michel de Montaigne, a Renaissance French writer. In the second book of his Essais, near the final of the twelfth chapter, Montaigne describes a nobleman who experienced visual anosognosia but denied his own blindness.

Anton syndrome was first reported by an Austrian psychiatrist and neurologist, Gabriel Anton, in 1895. Anton described the case of Juliane Hochriehser, a 69-year-old experiencing anosognosia, with cortical deafness that stemmed from lesions on both of her temporal lobes. After this initial finding, Anton went on to describe other individuals who had similar experiences of objective blindness and deafness but denied their deficiencies. Although cases of Anton syndrome are mostly reported in adults, there was a notable case of a young child experiencing it. The European Journal of Neurology published an article in 2007 that examines a case study of a six-year-old child with Anton syndrome and early stages of adrenoleukodystrophy. The child reportedly had abnormal eye movements, would often fall, and would reach for things and often miss his target. His visual acuity was less than 20/200, being unable to read the large letters on a standard chart even when just 3 feet away. He denied having headaches, diplopia, or eye pain and seemed unconcerned and unaware of his poor eyesight. Upon examination, his pupils were equal in shape, round, and reactive to light. His mother commented that he developed unusual eye movements and that they had a "roving quality".

== See also ==
- Prosopagnosia – Cognitive disorder of face perception
- Riddoch syndrome – Type of visual impairment
- Visual release hallucinations – Experience of hallucinations by blind people
