= Ernst von Bergmann =

German surgeon (1836–1907)

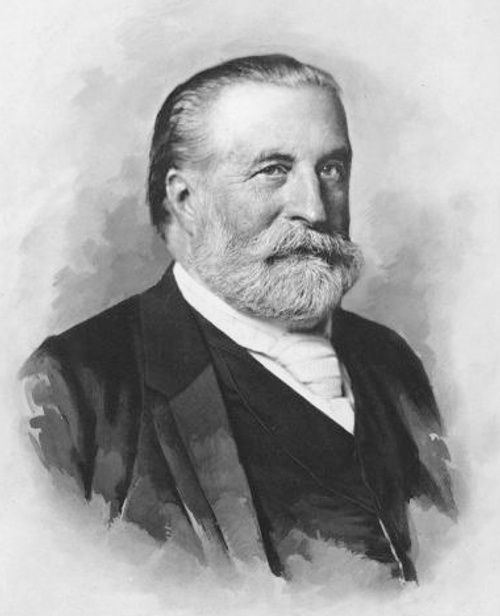
- von Bergmann c. 1890
- Born: Ernst Gustav Benjamin von Bergmann; 16 December 1836; Riga, Livonia Governorate, Russian Empire
- Died: 25 March 1907 (aged 70); Wiesbaden, Kingdom of Prussia, German Empire
- Education: Imperial University of Dorpat
- Known for: Sterilisation of surgical instruments and Hydrocolectomy
- Scientific career
- Fields: Surgeon
- Workplaces: University of Berlin

Ernst Gustav Benjamin von Bergmann (16 December 1836 – 25 March 1907) was a Baltic German surgeon. He was the first physician to introduce heat sterilisation of surgical instruments and is known as a pioneer of aseptic surgery.

== Early life and education ==
Born in Riga, Livonia Governorate (now Latvia), in 1860 he earned his doctorate at the Imperial University of Dorpat. He then worked as an assistant at the surgical clinic, and trained for surgery under Georg von Adelmann (his future father-in-law), and Georg von Oettingen. He received his certification in 1864.

== Career ==
From 1871 to 1878 he was a professor of surgery at Dorpat. In 1878 he became a professor at Würzburg; in 1882 he relocated to the University of Berlin as a successor to Bernhard von Langenbeck. von Bergmann continued as a professor of surgery at Berlin for the remainder of his career. Two of his assistants in Berlin were Curt Schimmelbusch (1860–1895) and Friedrich Gustav von Bramann (1854–1913).

== Personal life and death ==
Bergmann died in Wiesbaden. His son, Gustav von Bergmann (1878–1955) was a noted doctor of internal medicine.

== Contributions ==
Bergmann was the first physician to introduce heat sterilization of surgical instruments, thus greatly reducing the number of infections in surgery. He also used steam sterilized dressing material, demonstrating its superiority to chemical antisepsis. He was also an early adopter of the "white coat".

He served as a medical officer in the Austro-Prussian War (1866), the Franco-Prussian War (1870–71), and the Russo-Turkish War (1877–78), gaining valuable experience in treating wounds. He was deeply interested in the etiology and pathogenesis of diseases associated with battle-related wounds. As a medical officer, he expressed the need for a well-trained ancillary and nursing personnel and also for the implementation of a modified procedure for handling gunshot wounds, in particular, wounds involving the joints and cranium.

Bergmann pioneered the hydrocelectomy (hydrocele operation), contributed to improved appendectomy procedures, and performed the first successful esophageal diverticulum operation.

Bergmann wrote numerous medical and surgical works, including a classic treatise on head injuries, Die Lehre von den Kopfverletzungen (1880), and a book on brain surgery, Die Chirurgische Behandlung der Hirnkrankheiten (1888). In 1904, with Martin Kirchner and Robert Kutner, he co-founded the Zeitschrift für ärztliche Fortbildung ("Journal of Medical Education"). With Friedrich von Bramann and English physician Morell Mackenzie (1837–1892), he attended to Frederick III (1831–1888), when the emperor was dying of laryngeal cancer.

The Ernst von Bergmann Clinic in Potsdam, the Ernst-von-Bergmann-Kaserne in Munich, and the Ernst von Bergmann Plaque of the German Medical Association, are named in his honor.

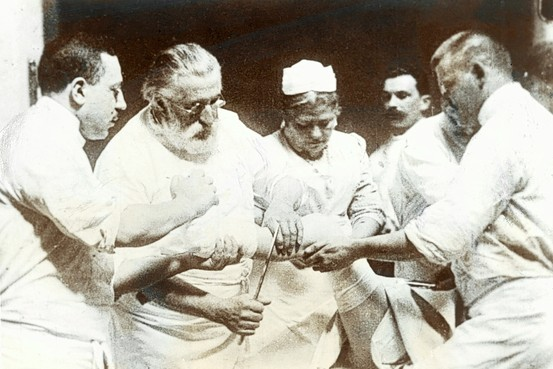
Bergmann and his assistants in "white coats" (c. 1897)

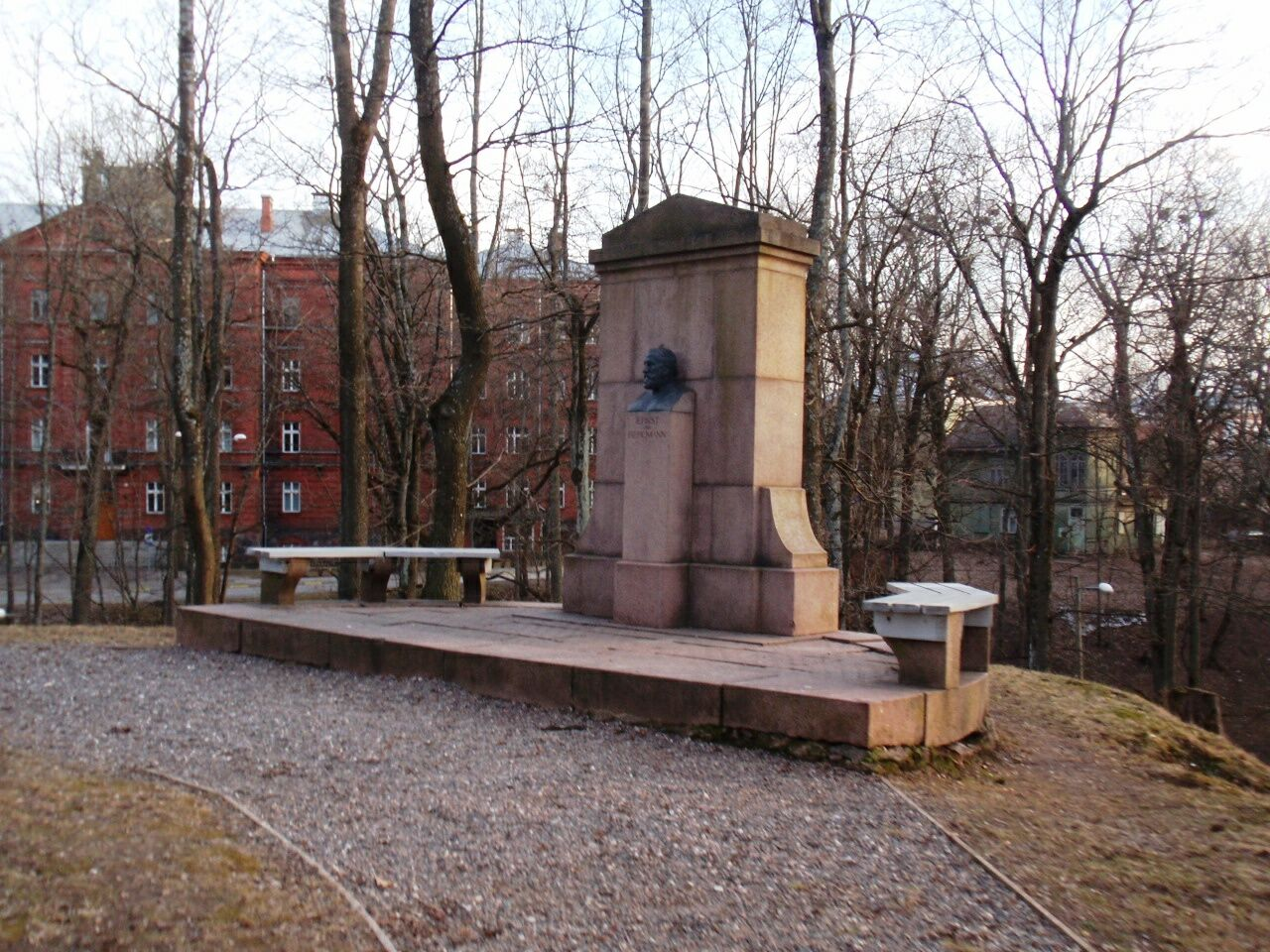
Monument of Bergmann in Tartu (former Dorpat)

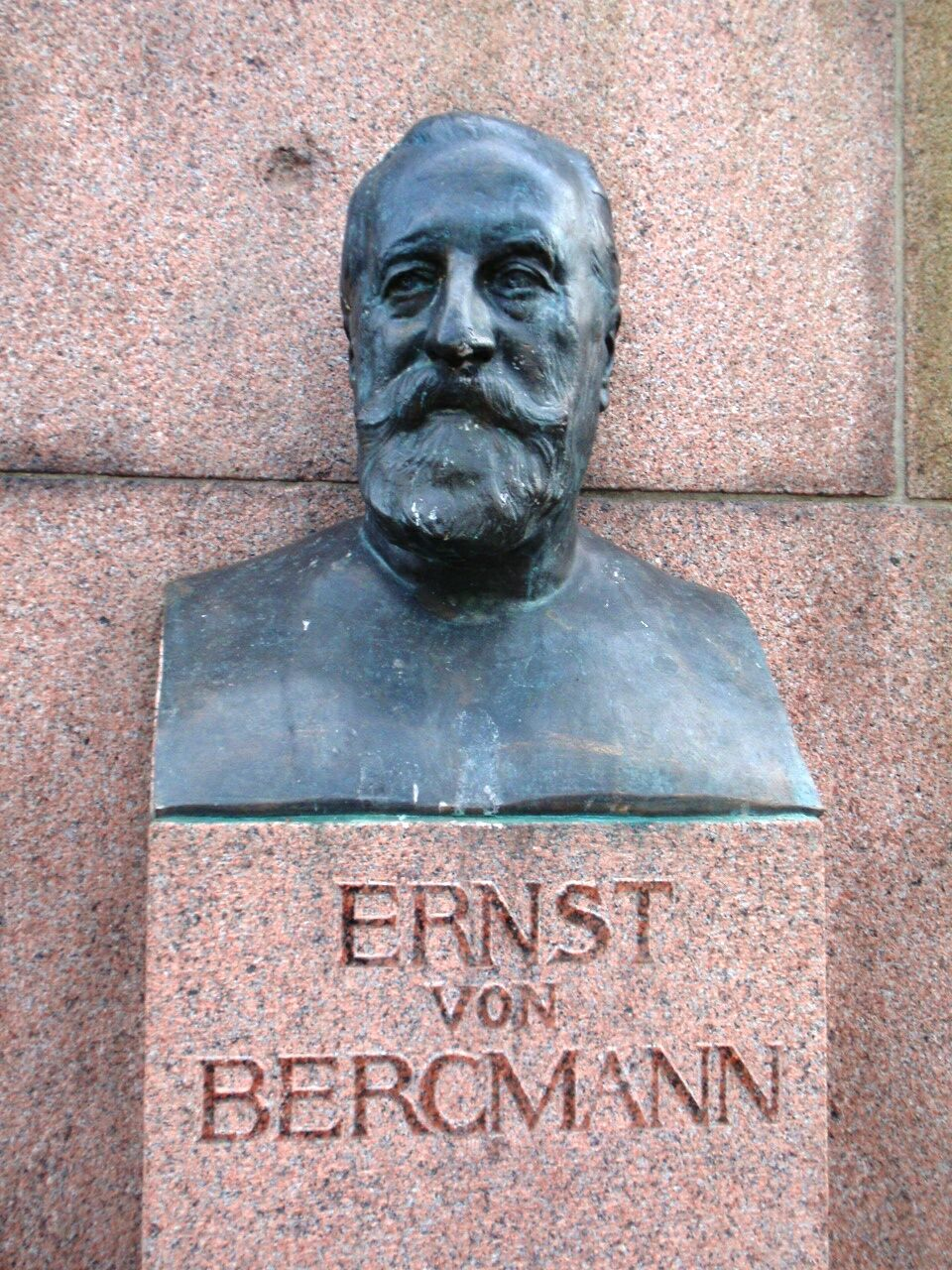
Monument of Bergmann (plaque)

== See also ==
- List of Baltic German scientists
