= Krystel Huxlin =

Vision scientist and researcher

Krystel Huxlin is the James V. Aquavella Professor at the University of Rochester in Upstate New York. She is known for her work on the study and treatment of cortical blindness, using psycophysics to investigate the properties of the blind and recovered fields of stroke victims.

== Education and career ==
Huxlin earned her Bachelor of Medical Sciences (1991) and Ph.D. in neuroscience (1994) in Australia at the University of Sydney. In 1999 she moved to the University of Rochester. As of 2026 Huxling holds the James V. Aquavella Professorship in the Department of Ophthalmology at the University of Rochester.

Huxlin served as president of the Vision Science Society from 2024 to 2025.

== Research ==
Huxlin is known for her work on corneal biology and corneal would healing. She has also researched stroke-induced cortical blindness, including detailing methods of recovering lost vision, assessing the properties of visual relearning, and demonstrating methods of boosting recovery in patients.

== Awards and honors ==
Huxlin was elected an Optica fellow in 2023 and a fellow of the Association for Research in Vision and Ophthalmology in 2024.

== Selected publications ==
- Huxlin, K. R.; Sefton, A. J.; Furby, J. H. (1992). "The origin and development of retinal astrocytes in the mouse". Journal of Neurocytology. 21 (7): 530–544. doi:10.1007/BF01186955. ISSN 0300-4864.
- Huxlin, Krystel R.; Martin, Tim; Kelly, Kristin; Riley, Meghan; Friedman, Deborah I.; Burgin, W. Scott; Hayhoe, Mary (2009-04-01). "Perceptual Relearning of Complex Visual Motion after V1 Damage in Humans". Journal of Neuroscience. 29 (13): 3981–3991. doi:10.1523/JNEUROSCI.4882-08.2009. ISSN 0270-6474. PMC 2825043. PMID 19339594.
- Das, Anasuya; Tadin, Duje; Huxlin, Krystel R. (2014-08-27). "Beyond Blindsight: Properties of Visual Relearning in Cortically Blind Fields". Journal of Neuroscience. 34 (35): 11652–11664. doi:10.1523/JNEUROSCI.1076-14.2014. ISSN 0270-6474. PMC 4145170. PMID 25164661.
