= Cortical blindness =

- Specialty: Neurology

Cortical blindness is the total or partial loss of vision in a normal-appearing eye caused by damage to the brain's occipital cortex. Cortical blindness can be acquired or congenital, and may also be transient in certain instances. Acquired cortical blindness is most often caused by loss of blood flow to the occipital cortex from either unilateral or bilateral posterior cerebral artery blockage (ischemic stroke) and by cardiac surgery. In most cases, the complete loss of vision is not permanent and the patient may recover some of their vision (cortical visual impairment). Congenital cortical blindness is most often caused by perinatal ischemic stroke, encephalitis, and meningitis. Rarely, a patient with acquired cortical blindness may have little or no insight that they have lost vision, a phenomenon known as Anton–Babinski syndrome.

Cortical blindness and cortical visual impairment (CVI), which refers to the partial loss of vision caused by cortical damage, are both classified as subsets of neurological visual impairment (NVI). NVI and its three subtypes—cortical blindness, cortical visual impairment, and delayed visual maturation—must be distinguished from ocular visual impairment in terms of their different causes and structural foci, the brain and the eye, respectively. One diagnostic marker of this distinction is that the pupils of individuals with cortical blindness will respond to light whereas those of individuals with ocular visual impairment will not.

== Symptoms and signs ==
The most common symptoms of acquired and transient cortical blindness include:

- A complete loss of visual sensation and of vision
- Preservation/sparing of the abilities to perceive light and/or moving, but not static objects (Riddoch syndrome)
- A lack of visual fixation and tracking
- Denial of visual loss (Anton–Babinski syndrome)
- Visual hallucinations
- Macular sparing, in which vision in the fovea is spared from the blindness.

== Causes ==
The most common cause of cortical blindness is ischemia (oxygen deprivation) to the occipital lobes caused by blockage to one or both of the posterior cerebral arteries. However, other conditions have also been known to cause acquired and transient cortical blindness, including:

- Congenital abnormalities of the occipital lobe
- Head trauma to the occipital lobe of the brain
- Bilateral lesions of the primary visual cortex
- Infection
- Creutzfeldt–Jakob disease (CJD), in association with a rapid onset of dementia
- Rarely, dissociative identity disorder (DID)
- Side effect of some anti-epilepsy drugs (AEDs)
- Hyperammonemia
- Eclampsia and, rarely, pre-eclampsia

The most common causes of congenital cortical blindness are:

- Traumatic brain injury (TBI) to the occipital lobe of the brain
- Congenital abnormalities of the occipital lobe
- Perinatal ischemia
- Encephalitis
- Meningitis

== Diagnosis ==
A patient with cortical blindness has no vision but the response of his/her pupil to light is intact (as the reflex does not involve the cortex). Therefore, one diagnostic test for cortical blindness is to first objectively verify the optic nerves and the non-cortical functions of the eyes are functioning normally. This involves confirming that patient can distinguish light/dark, and that his/her pupils dilate and contract with light exposure. Then, the patient is asked to describe something he/she would be able to recognize with normal vision. For example, the patient would be asked the following:

- "How many fingers am I holding up?"
- "What does that sign (on a custodian's closet, a restroom door, an exit sign) say?"
- "What kind of vending machine (with a vivid picture of a well-known brand name on it) is that?"

Patients with cortical blindness will not be able to identify the item being questioned about at all or will not be able to provide any details other than color or perhaps general shape. This indicates that the lack of vision is neurological rather than ocular. It specifically indicates that the occipital cortex is unable to correctly process and interpret the intact input coming from the retinas.

Fundoscopy should be normal in cases of cortical blindness. Cortical blindness can be associated with visual hallucinations, denial of visual loss (Anton–Babinski syndrome), and the ability to perceive moving but not static objects (Riddoch syndrome).

== Outcome ==
The prognosis of a patient with acquired cortical blindness depends largely on the original cause of the blindness. For instance, patients with bilateral occipital lesions have a much lower chance of recovering vision than patients who suffered a transient ischemic attack or women who experienced complications associated with eclampsia. In patients with acquired cortical blindness, a permanent complete loss of vision is rare. The development of cortical blindness into the milder cortical visual impairment is a more likely outcome. Furthermore, some patients regain vision completely, as is the case with transient cortical blindness associated with eclampsia and the side effects of certain anti-epilepsy drugs.

Recent research by Krystel R. Huxlin and others on the relearning of complex visual motion following V1 damage has offered potentially promising treatments for individuals with acquired cortical blindness. These treatments focus on retraining and retuning certain intact pathways of the visual cortex which are more or less preserved in individuals who sustained damage to V1. Huxlin and others found that specific training focused on utilizing the "blind field" of individuals who had sustained V1 damage improved the patients' ability to perceive simple and complex visual motion. This sort of 'relearning' therapy may provide a good workaround for patients with acquired cortical blindness in order to better make sense of the visual environment.

== See also ==
- Blindsight
