= Georg von Adelmann =

German physician and surgeon (1811–1888)

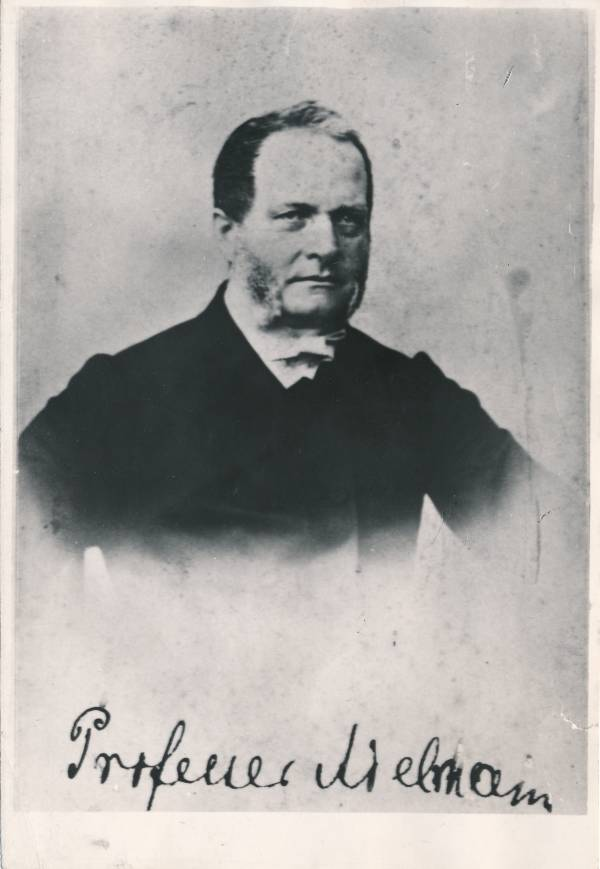
- Born: Georg Franz Blasius von Adelmann; June 28, 1811; Fulda
- Died: June 16, 1888 (aged 76); Berlin
- Scientific career
- Fields: Surgery
- Workplaces: Imperial University of Dorpat

Georg Franz Blasius von Adelmann (28 June 1811, in Fulda – 16 June 1888, in Berlin) was a German medical doctor and surgeon.

He studied medicine at the Universities of Marburg and Würzburg, receiving his doctorate in 1832 with the dissertation De dignitate lithontritiae. He then served as an assistant to Karl Friedrich Heusinger at the medical clinic in Marburg, followed by work as a physician in his hometown of Fulda (from 1835). Afterwards, he returned to Marburg as an assistant at the surgical clinic run by Christoph Ullmann.

By way of a recommendation from University of Heidelberg surgeon, Maximilian Joseph von Chelius, he was appointed to the chair of surgery at the Imperial University of Dorpat as successor to Nikolai Ivanovich Pirogov. From 1841 to 1871, he maintained this position, afterwards moving to Berlin, where he lived in retirement until his death in 1888. At Dorpat, he was succeeded by his son-in-law, renowned surgeon Ernst von Bergmann.

In 1860 he was given the title of Staatsrat. Adelmann is credited with introducing a procedure that involved flexion of the limb(s) as a treatment for arterial bleeding.

== Selected works ==
- Beiträge Zur Medicinischen und Chirurgischen Heilkunst, (three volumes) 1835-53 – Contributions to medicine and surgery.
- Annalen der Chirurgischen Abtheilung des Landkrankenhauses zu Fulda, während der Jahre 1835, 1836, (1840) – Annals from the surgical division at the country hospital in Fulda, years 1835 and 1836.
- Untersuchungen über krankhafte Zustände der Oberkieferhöhle, 1844 – Studies of pathological conditions involving the maxillary sinus.
- Beiträge zur chirurgischen Pathologie der Arterien, insbesondere zu ihrer Unterbindung, 1862 – Contributions to the surgical pathology of the arteries, in particular ligation.
- Beiträge zur chirurgischen Pathologie und Therapie der Ernährungsorgane, 1865 – Contributions to surgical pathology and therapy of the digestive organs.
- Die gewaltsame Beugung der Extremitäten als Stillungsmittel bei arteriellen Blutungen derselben, 1869 – Flexion of extremities as hemostasis for treatment of arterial bleeding.
