= Martin Kirchner =

German hygienist and bacteriologist (1854–1925)

Martin Kirchner (15 July 1854, in Spandau – 11 November 1925, in Berlin) was a German hygienist and bacteriologist, known for his work in the fight against tuberculosis.

He studied at the universities of Halle and Berlin, receiving his medical doctorate in 1878. From 1887 he worked as a physician under Robert Koch at the institute of hygiene in Berlin. In 1894 he obtained his habilitation for hygiene at the Technische Hochschule in Hannover, and in 1900 became an associate professor at the University of Berlin. From 1911 to 1919 he was head of the medical department at the Ministry of the Interior.

In 1904, with Ernst von Bergmann and Robert Kutner, he was co-founder of the Zeitschrift für ärztliche Fortbildung ("Journal of Medical Education").

== Selected works ==
- Die Entdeckung des Blutkreislaufs; historischkritische Darstellung, 1878 – The discovery of blood circulation; an historical critical view.
- William Harveys Verdienste um die Entdeckung des Blutkreislaufs, 1878 – William Harvey's merits on the discovery of blood circulation.
- Die Bedeutung der Bakteriologie für die öffentliche Gesundheitspflege, 1891 – The importance of bacteriology for public health care.
- Grundriss der Militär-Gesundheitspflege, 1896 – Outline of military health care.
- Hygiene und Seuchenbekämpfung; gesammelte Abhandlungen, 1904 – Hygiene and epidemic control; collected essays.
- Die gesetzlichen Grundlagen der Seuchenbekämpfung im Deutschen reiche, 1907 – The legal basis of disease control in the German Reich.
- Lehrbuch der Militär-Gesundheitspflege, 1910 – Textbook of military health care.
- Schutzpockenimpfung und Impfgesetz unter Benutzung amtlicher Quellen, 1911 – Smallpox vaccination and vaccination laws according to official sources.
- Die ätiologie und die bekämpfung der tuberkulose : 1887–89, 1912 – The etiology and control of tuberculosis, 1887–89.
