= Robert Kutner =

German urologist (1867–1913)

Robert Kutner (11 April 1867, Ückermünde – 5 October 1913, Berlin) was a German urologist.

He studied medicine at the universities of Berlin, Kiel and Freiburg and furthered his education in Vienna and Paris. While a student, his influences were Maximilian Nitze in Berlin, Leopold Ritter von Dittel in Vienna and Jean Casimir Félix Guyon in Paris. In 1891, he received his medical doctorate, and shortly afterwards, he settled in Berlin as a specialist of urinary diseases. In 1902, he obtained the title of professor. Kutner was among the first to use photography to acquire a visual record of internal body cavities.

Along with Ernst von Bergmann, he is regarded as one of the founders of the medical training system in Germany. He was devoted to the development of medical postgraduate education in Germany, and in 1906 was named director of the Kaiserin Friedrich-Haus for medical postgraduate study. In 1904, with Bergmann and hygienist Martin Kirchner, he founded the publication Zeitschrift für ärztliche Fortbildung ("Journal of Medical Education").

== Selected works ==
- Über Photographie innerer Körperhöhlen, insbesondere der Harnblase und des Magens, Berlin, 1891 – On photography of internal body cavities, in particular, the urinary bladder and the stomach.
- Technik und praktische Bedeutung der Asepsis bei der Behandlung der Harnleiden, 1897 – Technique and practical importance of asepsis in the treatment of the urinary tract.
- Die instrumentelle Behandlung der Harnleiden, mit besonderer Berückichtigung der Technik des Katheterismus, 1898 – Instrumental treatment of the urinary tract, with special attention given to the technique of catheterization.
