= Cortical visual impairment =

Visual impairment caused by a brain problem

Cortical visual impairment (CVI), also known as cerebral visual impairment, is a form of visual impairment that is caused by a brain problem rather than an eye problem. (The latter is sometimes termed "ocular visual impairment" when discussed in contrast to cortical visual impairment.) Some people have both CVI and a form of ocular visual impairment.

CVI is also sometimes known as cortical blindness, although most people with CVI are not totally blind. The term neurological visual impairment (NVI) covers both CVI and total cortical blindness. Delayed visual maturation, another form of NVI, is similar to CVI, except the child's visual difficulties resolve in a few months. Though the vision of a person with CVI may change, it rarely if ever becomes totally normal.

The major causes of CVI are as follows: asphyxia, hypoxia (a lack of sufficient oxygen in the body's blood cells), or ischemia (not enough blood supply to the brain), all of which may occur during the birth process; developmental brain defects; head injury; hydrocephalus (when the cerebrospinal fluid does not circulate properly around the brain, and collects in the head, putting pressure on the brain); a stroke involving the occipital lobe; and infections of the central nervous system, such as meningitis and encephalitis.

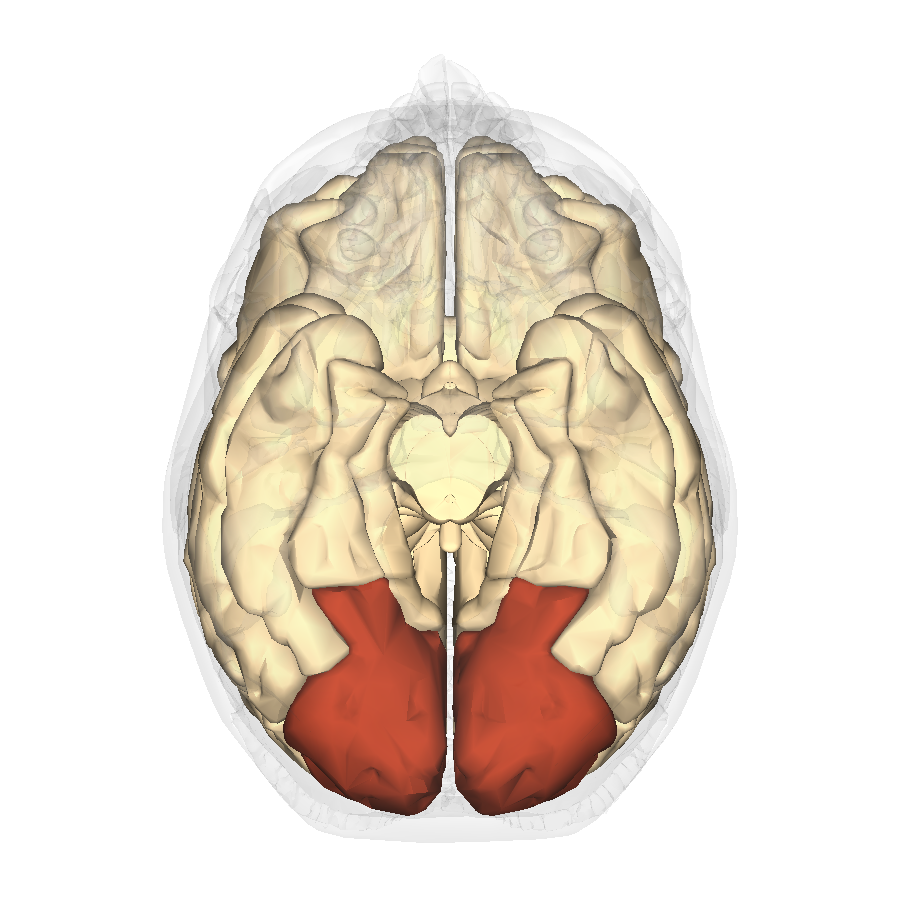
Location of the occupital lobe

== Visual and behavioural characteristics ==
Individuals' visual and behavioural characteristics vary and may include several (but not necessarily all) of the following:

- Vision fluctuations likely to appear can involve a variety of factors including but not limited to:
  - environment
  - visual complexity of target
  - utilise simplified views e.g. larger text
  - familiarity of target
  - other sensory factors
  - level of fatigue
  - personal state of well-being (i.e. comfort, sickness)
- Visual performance may vary eye to eye, impacting on depth perception
- Field of view
  - tunnel vision
  - nystagmus
  - Movement
    - depends on speed, reflective properties
    - cognitive overload
  - scotomas
  - blindsight, not always effective, but an intuitive way of knowing surroundings without seeing them
- Eye contact
  - Affecting social acceptance in Western cultures
- Photophobia
  - sensitivity to changes in light and vision
  - one third of people with CVI are affected
  - possible compulsive staring at light sources
  - task lighting
- Colour vision
  - colour perception often intact
  - colour coding often utilized
  - high contrast can increase clarity.

The presence of CVI does not necessarily mean that the person's brain is damaged in any other way, but it can often be accompanied by other neurological problems, the most common being epilepsy.

== Diagnosis ==
Diagnosing CVI is difficult. A diagnosis is usually made when visual performance is poor but it is not possible to explain this from an eye examination. Before CVI was widely known among professionals, some would conclude that the patient was faking their problems or had for some reason engaged in self-deception. However, there are now testing techniques that do not depend on the patient's words and actions, such as fMRI scanning, or the use of electrodes to detect responses to stimuli in both the retina and the brain. These can be used to verify that the problem is indeed due to a malfunction of the visual cortex and/or the posterior visual pathway.

Clinical Methods include surveys and vision tests to help identify CVI. They can evaluate mobility, coordination, visual acuity, and focus.

== See also ==
- Cortical blindness
