= Gender symbol =

Symbols of gender, sex, or sexuality

♂ ♀ ⚥ △ □ ○o

Gender symbol
- In Unicode: U+2642 ♂ MALE SIGN; U+2640 ♀ FEMALE SIGN; U+26A5 ⚥ MALE AND FEMALE SIGN; U+25B3 △ WHITE UP-POINTING TRIANGLE; U+25A1 □ WHITE SQUARE; U+25CB ○ WHITE CIRCLE

A gender symbol is a pictogram or glyph used to represent sex and gender, for example in biology and medicine, genealogy, LGBTQ subculture, or gender politics.

In his books Mantissa Plantarum (1767) and Mantissa Plantarum Altera (1771), Carl Linnaeus regularly used the planetary symbols of Mars, Venus and Mercury (♂, ♀ and ☿) for male, female and hermaphroditic (perfect) flowers, respectively. Botanists now use ⚥ for the last.

In genealogy, including kinship in anthropology and pedigrees in animal husbandry, the geometric shapes △ or □ are used for male and ○ for female. These symbols are also used on public toilets in some countries.

The modern international pictograms used to indicate male and female public toilets, 🚹︎ and 🚺︎, became widely used in the 1960s and 1970s. They are sometimes abstracted to ▽ for male and △ for female.

== Biology and medicine ==
The three standard sex symbols in biology are male ♂, female ♀ and hermaphroditic ⚥; originally the symbol for Mercury, ☿, was used for the last. These symbols were first used by Carl Linnaeus in 1751 to denote whether flowers were male (stamens only), female (pistil only) or perfect flowers with both pistils and stamens. (Most flowering and conifer plant species are hermaphroditic and either bear flowers/cones that themselves are hermaphroditic, or bear both male and female flowers/cones on the same plant.) These symbols are now ubiquitous in biology and medicine to indicate the sex of an individual, for example of a patient. (Note: In the biological sense of the word, there are no human (or mammalian) hermaphrodites, but 'hermaphodite' has long been used for ambisexual people who are now more commonly labeled intersex.)

== Genealogy ==
Minimal kinship chart: a male and female producing male and female offspring

Kinship charts use a triangle △ for male and circle ○ for female. Pedigree charts published in scientific papers use an earlier anthropological convention of a square □ for male and a circle ○ for female.

Before a shape distinction was adopted, all individuals had been represented by a circle in Morgan's 1871 System of Consanguinity and Affinity of Human Family, where gender is encoded in the abbreviations for the kin relation (e.g. M for 'mother' and F for 'father'). W. H. R. Rivers distinguished gender in the words of the language being recorded by writing male kinship terms in all capitals and female kinship terms with normal capitalization. That convention was quite influential for a time, and his convention of prioritizing male kin by placing them to the left and females to the right continues to this day though there have been exceptions, such as Margaret Mead, who placed females to the left.

== Public toilets ==
The modern gender symbols used for public toilets, 🚹︎ for male and 🚺︎ for female, are pictograms created for the British Rail system in the mid-1960s. Before that, local usage had been more variable. For example, schoolhouse outhouses in the 19th-century United States had ventilation holes in their doors that were shaped like a starburst Sun ✴ or like a crescent Moon ☾, respectively, to indicate whether the toilet was for use by boys or girls. The British Rail pictograms – often color-coded blue and red – are now the norm for marking public toilets in much of the world, with the female symbol distinguished by a triangular skirt or dress, and in early years (and sometimes still) the male symbol stylized like a tuxedo.

These symbols are abstracted to varying degrees in different countries – for example, the circle-and-triangle variants (male) and (female) commonly found on portable toilets, sometimes abstracted further to a triangle △ (representing a skirt or dress) for female and an inverted triangle ▽ (representing a broad-shouldered tuxedo) for male in Lithuania.

In elementary schools, the pictograms may be of children rather than of adults, with the girl distinguished by her hair. In themed locations, such as bars and tourist attractions, a thematic image or figurine of a man and woman or boy and girl may be used.

In Poland, an inverted triangle ▽ is used for male while a circle ○ is used for female. Similarly, in the United States, California state law requires an upward-pointing arrow ▲ for male and a circle ● for female. These symbols were devised by Samuel Genensky, whose limited vision made more intricate signs illegible to him. The symbols are combined for gender-neutral restrooms.

In mainland China, silhouettes of heads in profile may be used as gender pictograms, generally alongside the Chinese characters for male (男) and female (女).

Some contemporary designs for restroom signage in public spaces are shifting away from symbols that demonstrate gender as binary as a way to be more inclusive.

Standard American Institute of Graphic Arts (AIGA) symbols

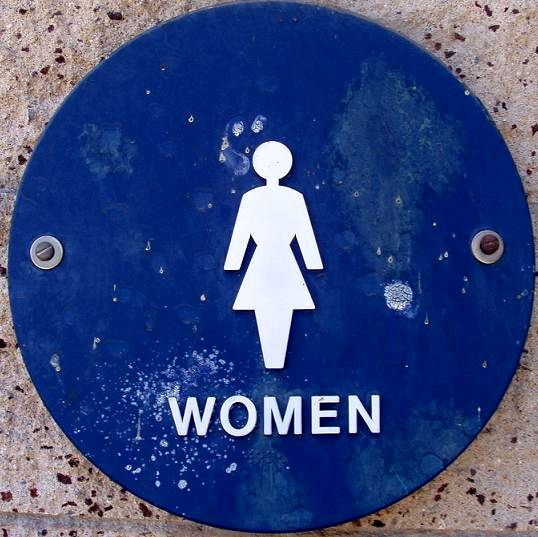
Non-AIGA women's symbol on a legally mandated circular background in US

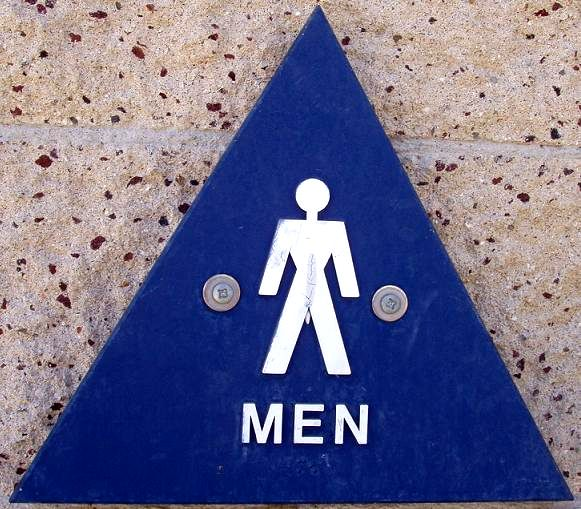
Non-AIGA men's symbol on a legally mandated triangular background in US

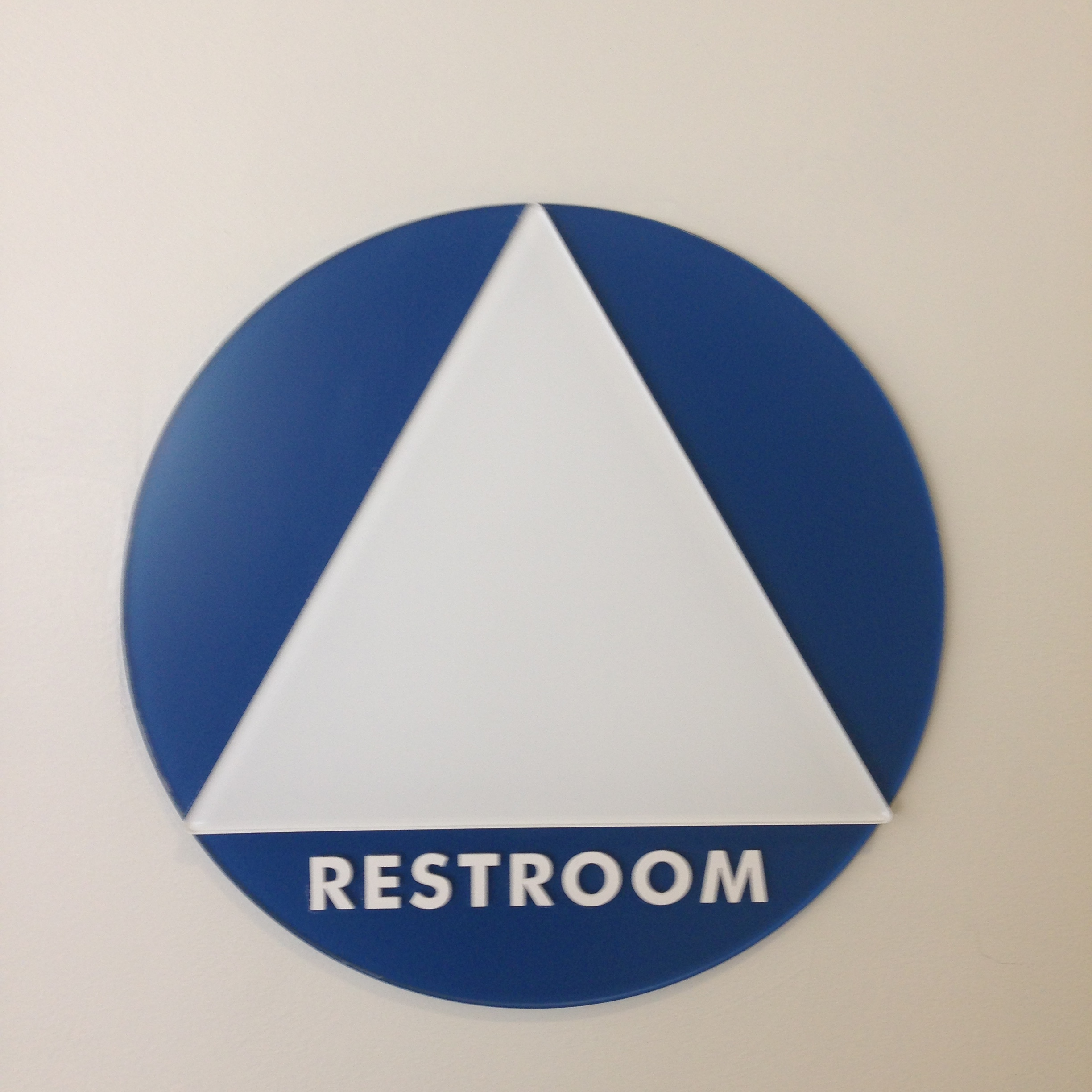
Gender-neutral sign in US, composed of legally mandated circle and triangle

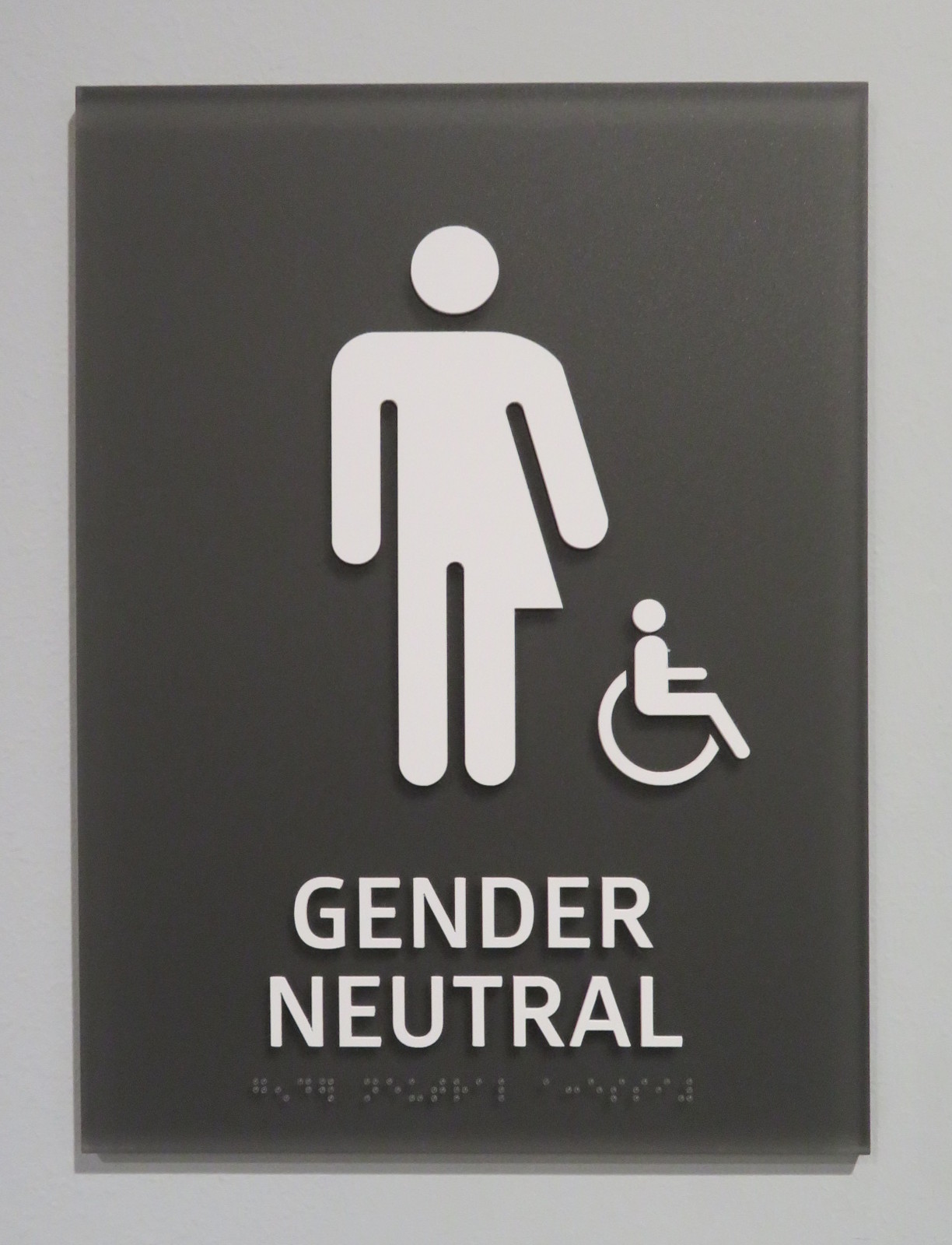
Accessible gender-neutral sign icon

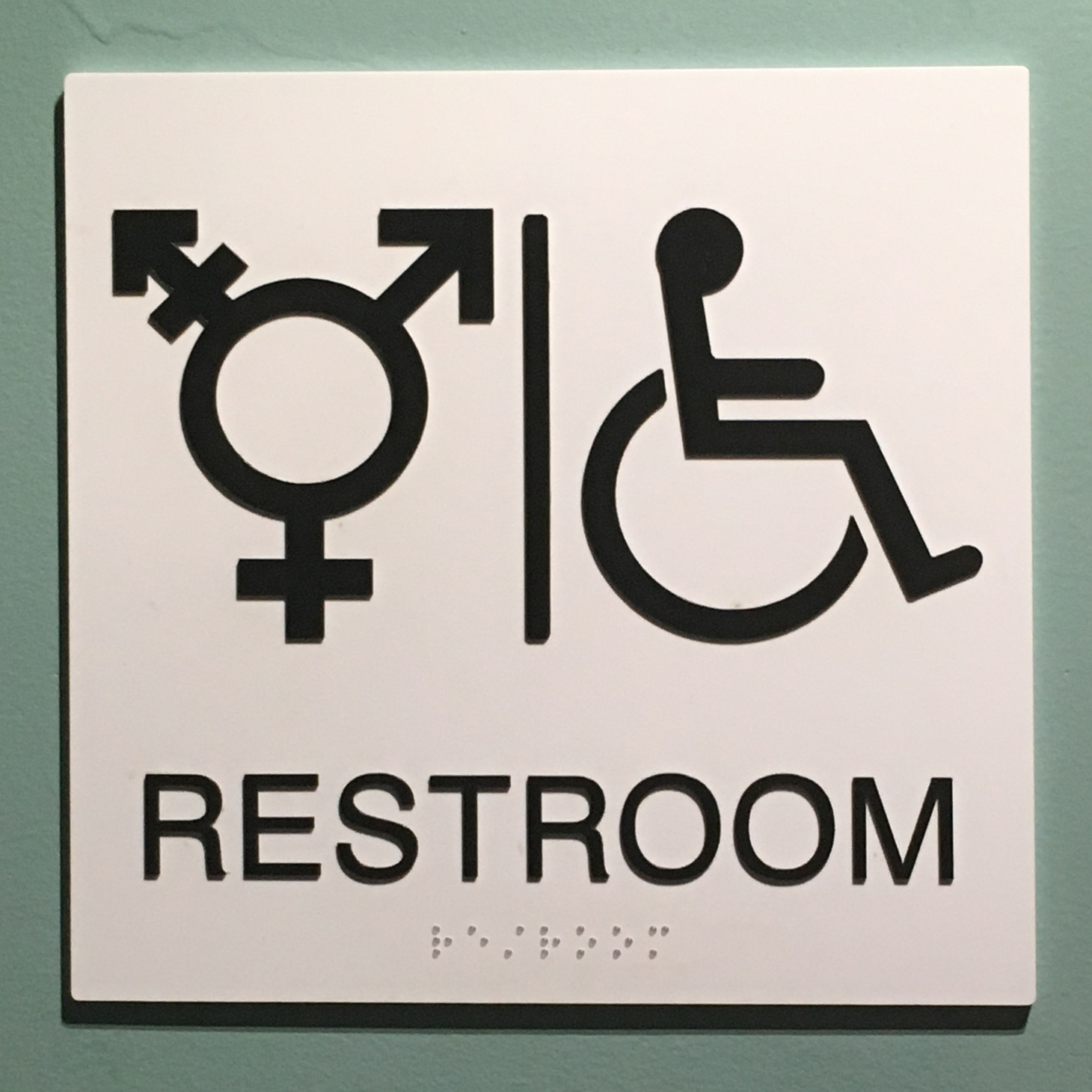
Idiosyncratic unisex restroom in US (see LGBTA symbols)

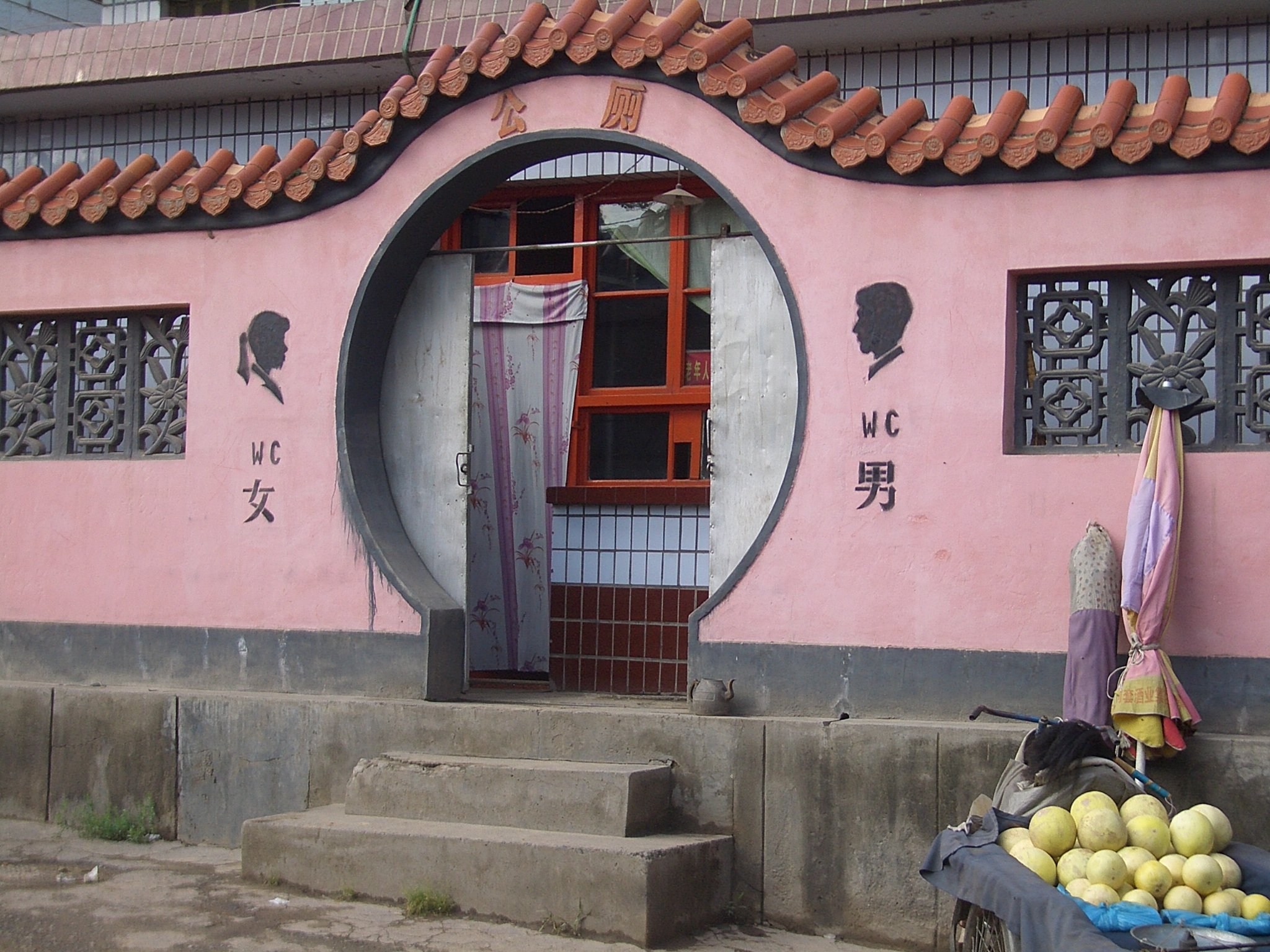
Public toilet in China, with female silhouette to the left and male to the right

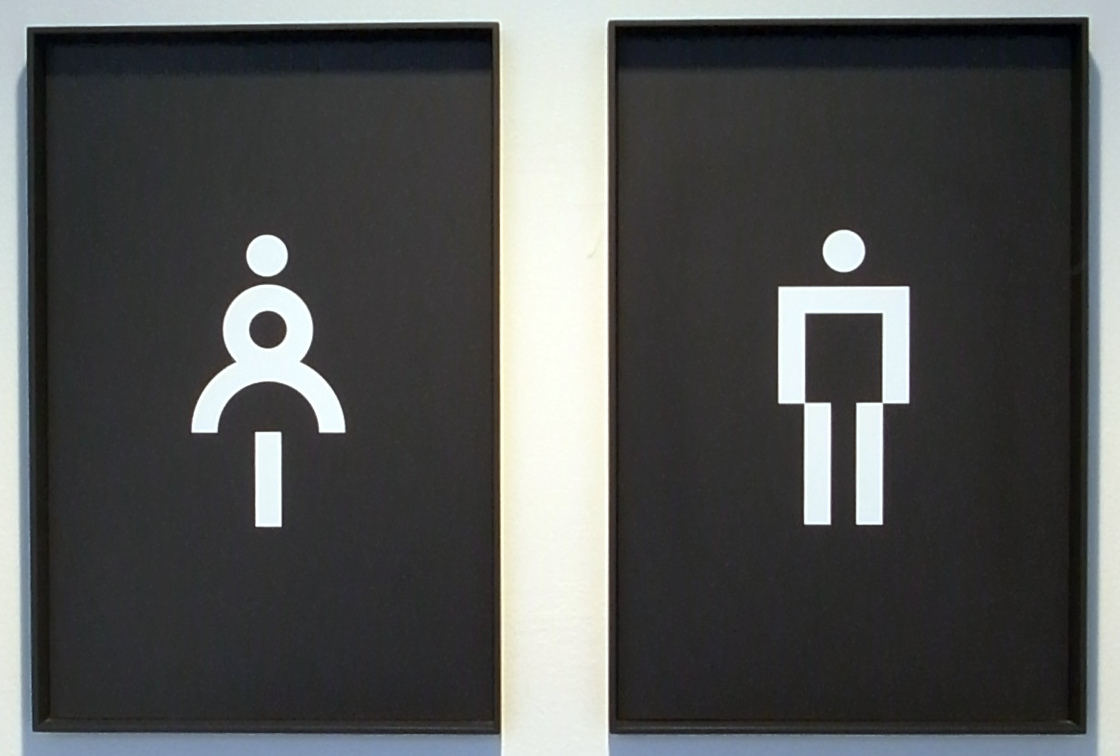
Idiosyncratic symbols in Japan

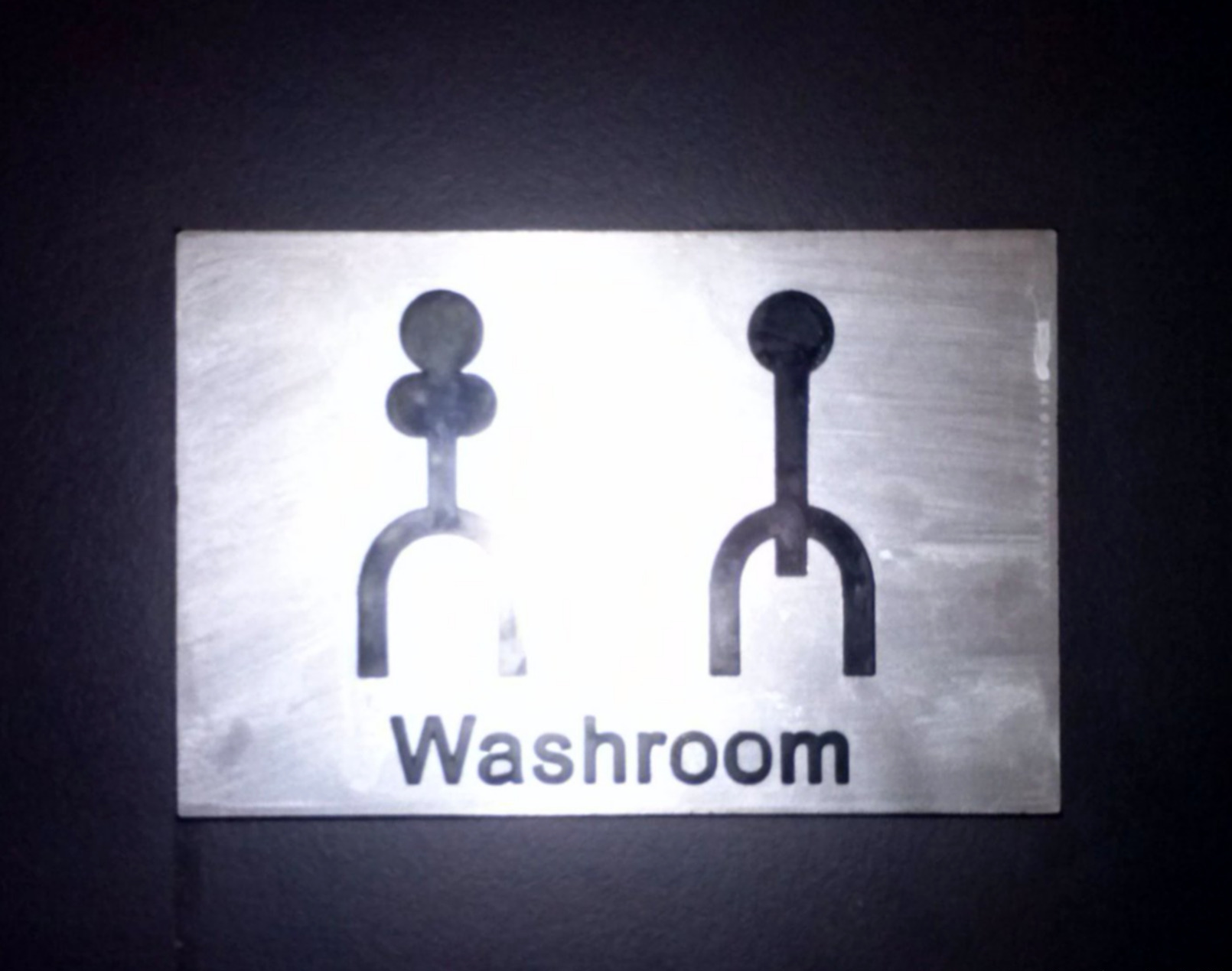
Humorous symbols in Austria

Semi-triangular tuxedo and dress shapes in Hungary

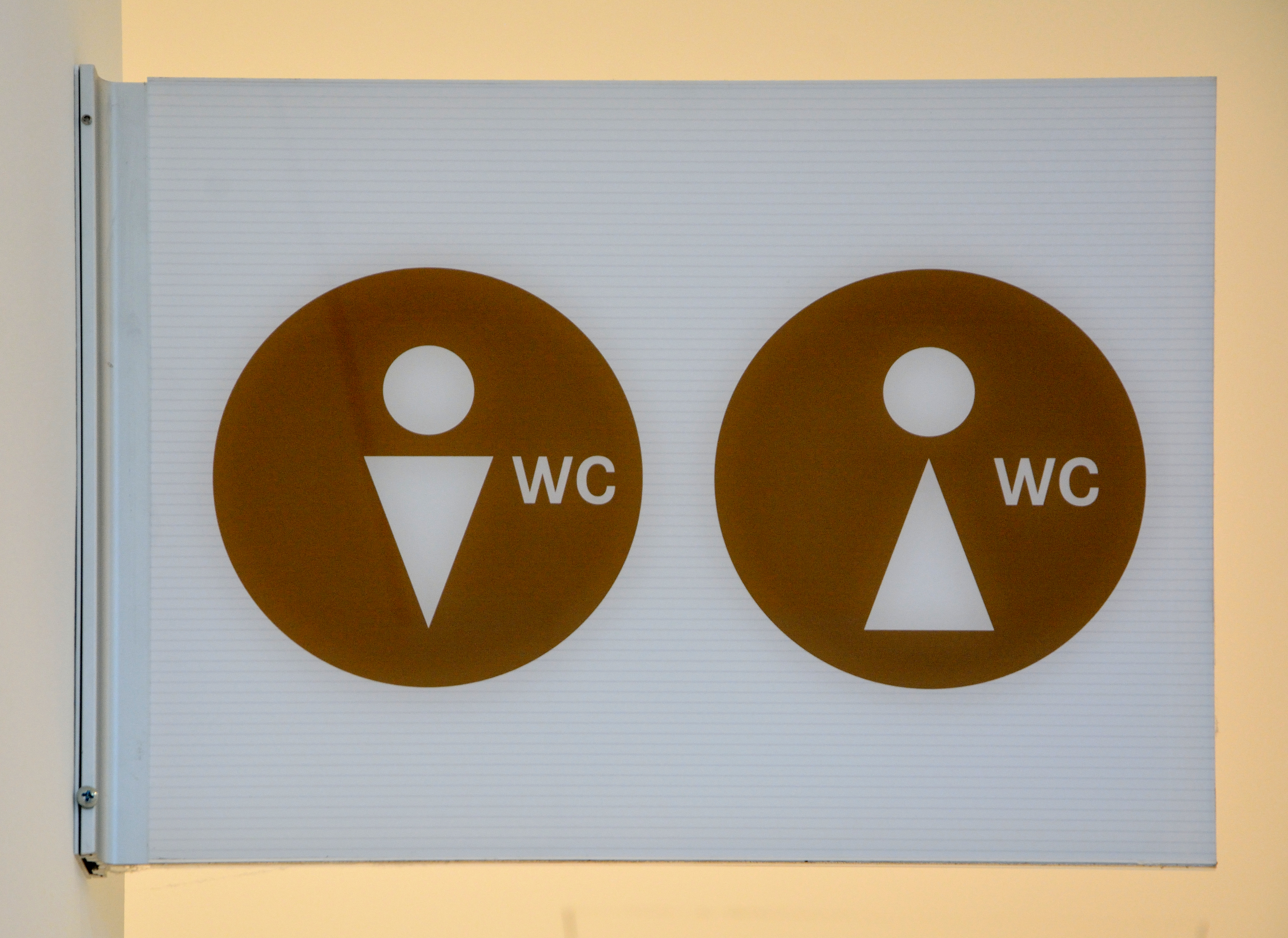
Triangle-plus-circle symbols in Austria

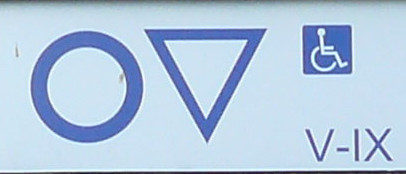
Circle (female) and inverted triangle (male) in Poland

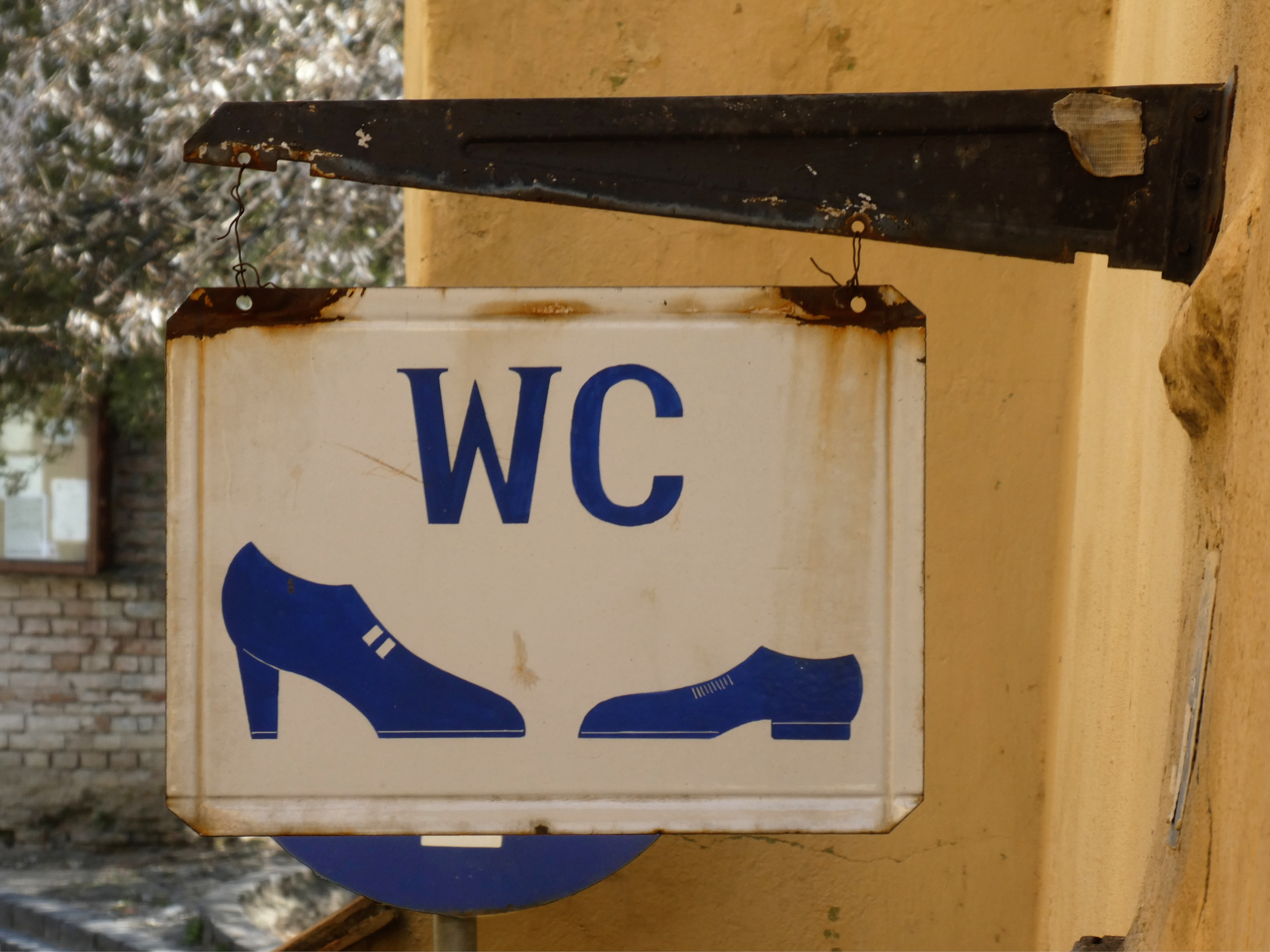
Sign in Romania, with men's and women's shoes representing gender

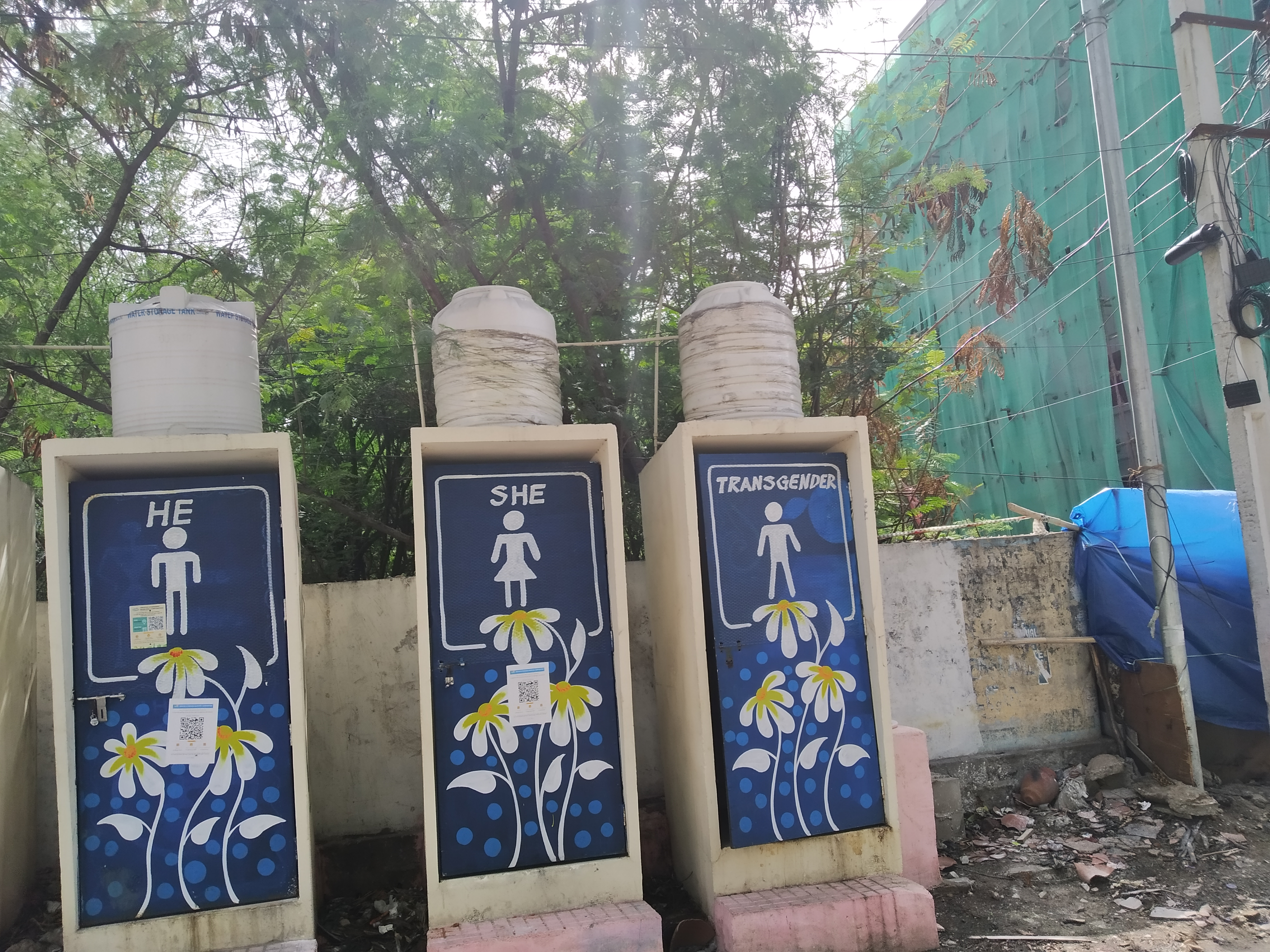
Male, female and hijra (trans) public toilets in India

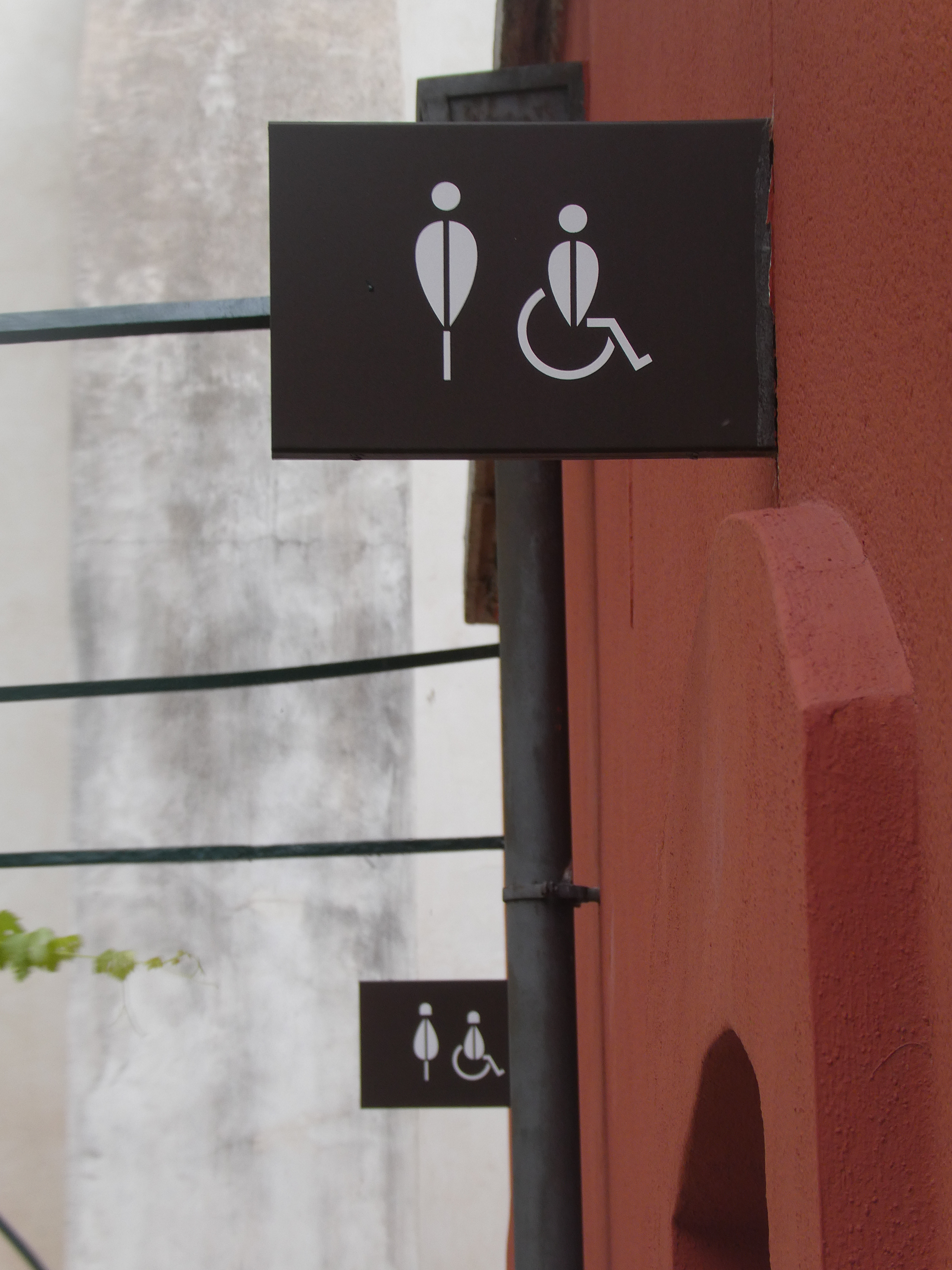
Signs in the Real Jardín Botánico de Madrid; the male is depicted with a large upper body and the female with wide hips

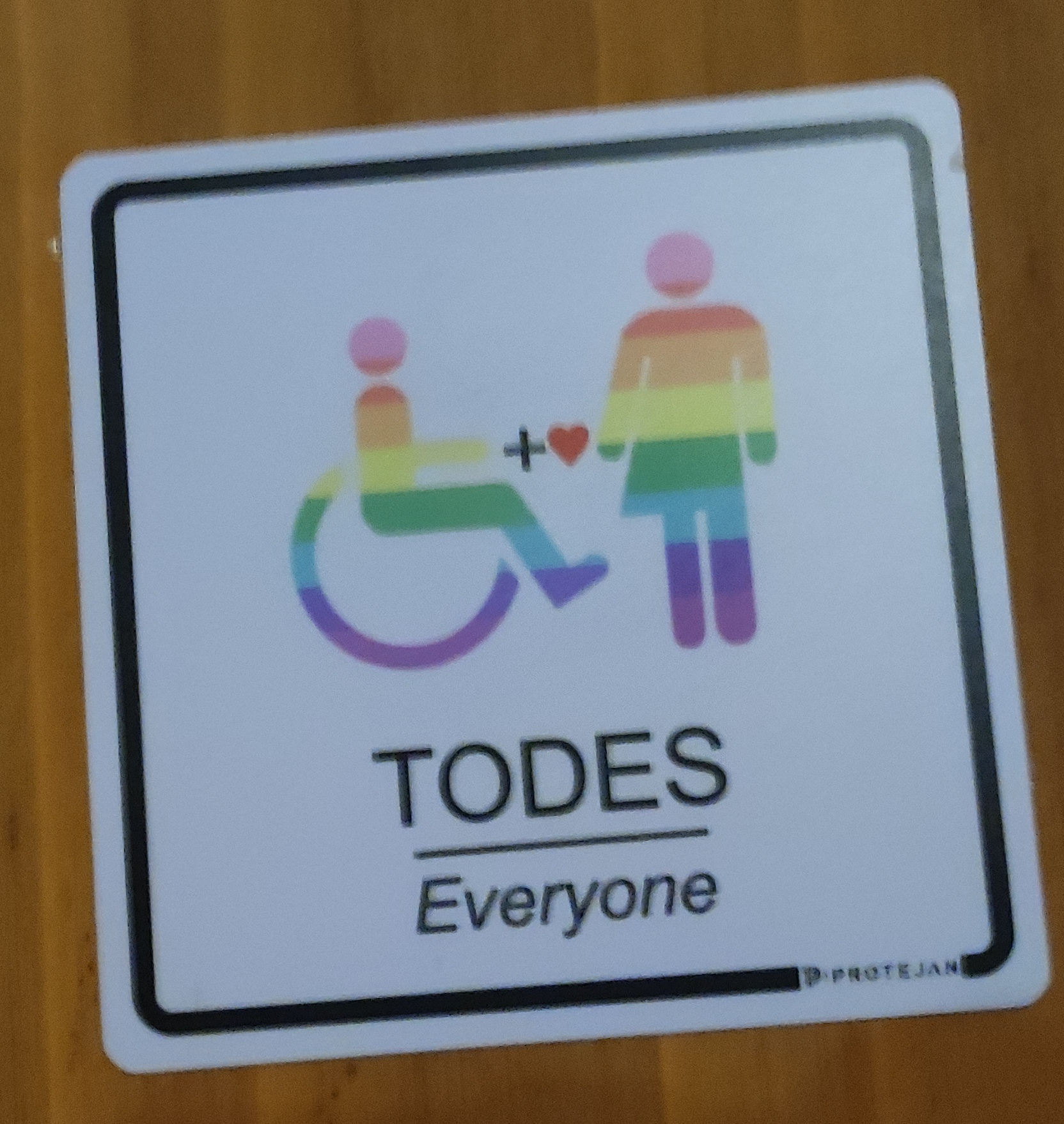
Rainbow accessible multigender icon with gender-neutral word

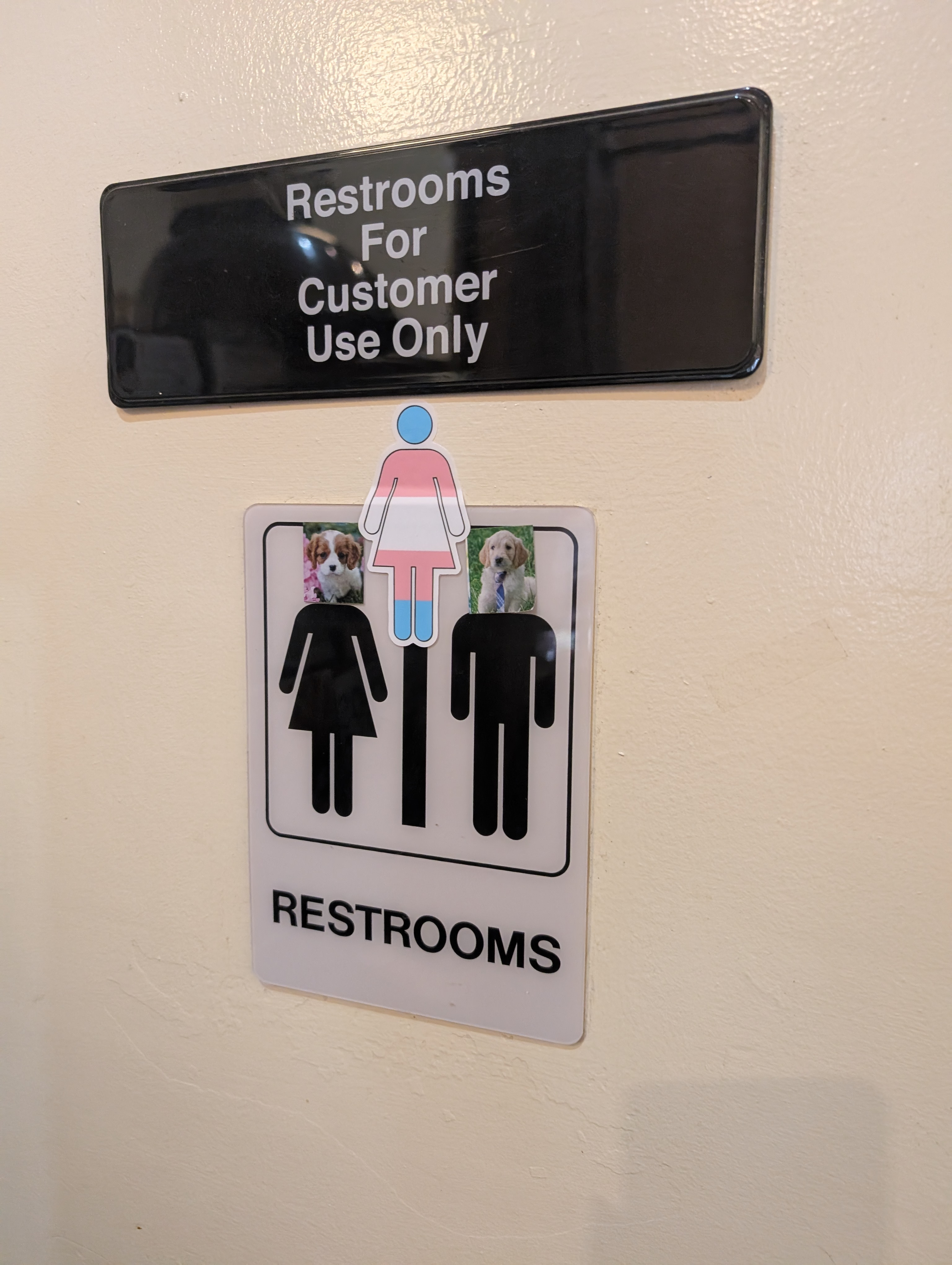
A bathroom sign in the US showing a transgender flag across a woman's bathroom symbol

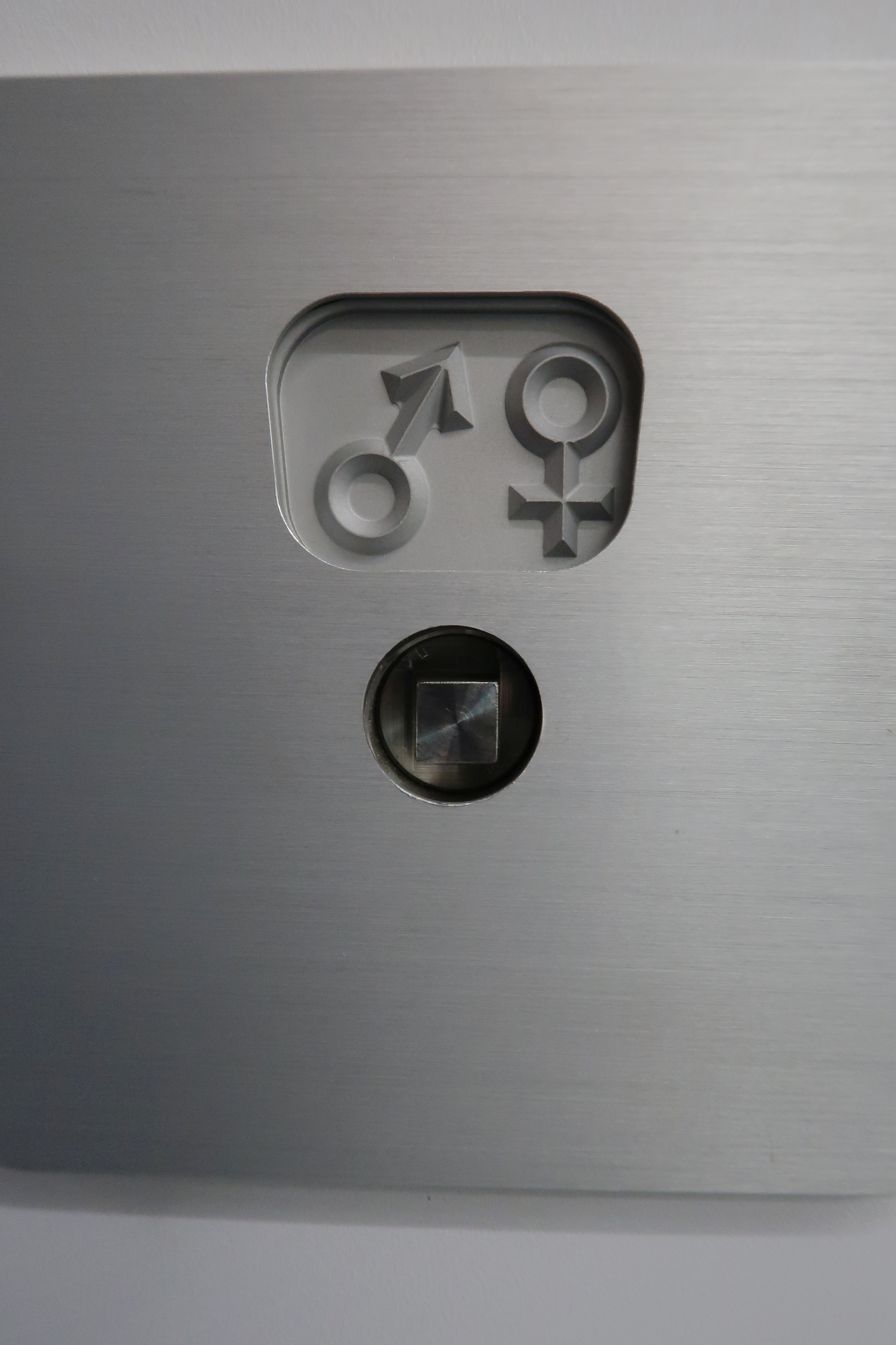
Gender symbols on a public toilet in Switzerland

== Sexual orientation and gender politics ==
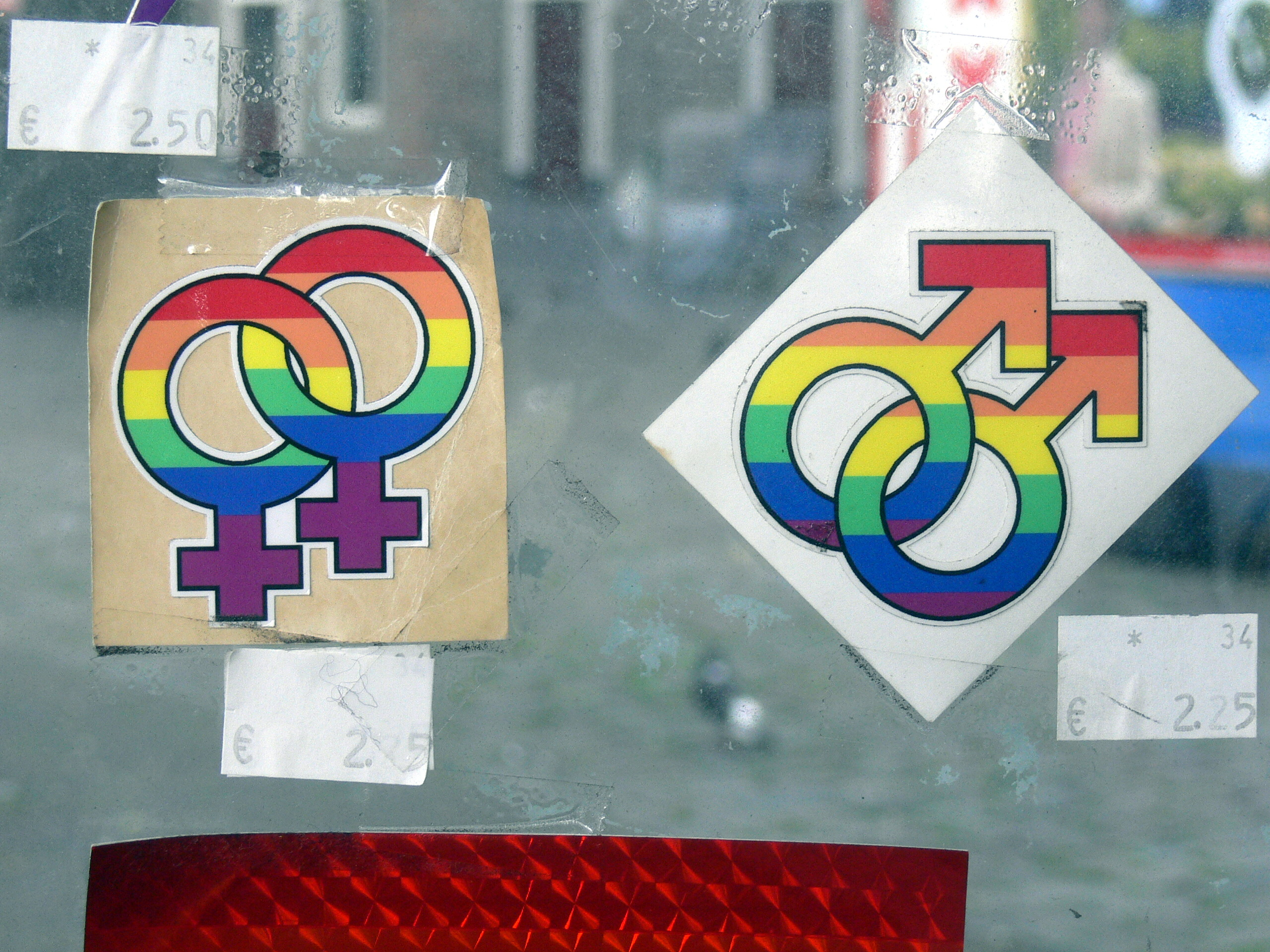
Lesbian and gay male interlocked gender sex symbols

Since the 1970s, variations of gender symbols have been used to express sexual orientation and gender politics. Two interlocking male symbols ⚣ are used to represent gay men while two interlocking female symbols ⚢ are often used to represent lesbians. Two female and two male symbols interlocked represent bisexuality, while an interlocked female and male symbol ⚤ represents heterosexuality.

The combined male-female symbol ⚥ is used to represent androgyne people.

The male-with-stroke symbol ⚦ is also used for transgender people; when additionally combined with the female ♀ and male ♂ symbols to create the symbol ⚧, it indicates transgender people or gender inclusivity.

The Mercury symbol ☿ and combined female/male symbol ⚥ have both been used to represent intersex people. The alchemical symbol for sublimate of antimony 🜬 is used to represent non-binary people. The neuter symbol ⚲ is also used to represent non-binary people, especially those who are neutrois or of a neutral gender. A featureless circle ○ is also used to represent non-binary people, especially those who are agender or genderless, as well as asexuality.

Since the 2000s, numerous variants of gender symbols have been introduced in the context of LGBTQ culture and politics. Some of these symbols have been adopted into Unicode (in the Miscellaneous Symbols block) beginning with version 4.1 in 2005.

== Encoding ==
Unicode Standard name	Symbol	Associated remark in the standard
U+2642 ♂ MALE SIGN	♂	
U+2640 ♀ FEMALE SIGN	♀	
U+26A5 ⚥ MALE AND FEMALE SIGN	⚥	Intersex, androgynous; hermaphrodite (in botany)
U+26A6 ⚦ MALE WITH STROKE SIGN	⚦	Transgender
U+26A7 ⚧ MALE WITH STROKE AND MALE AND FEMALE SIGN	⚧	Transgender
U+25B3 △ WHITE UP-POINTING TRIANGLE	△	
U+25BD ▽ WHITE DOWN-POINTING TRIANGLE	▽	
U+25A1 □ WHITE SQUARE	□	
U+25CB ○ WHITE CIRCLE	○	Asexuality, sexless, genderless
U+1F7D5 🟕 CIRCLED TRIANGLE	🟕	
U+1F6B9 🚹 MENS SYMBOL	🚹︎	Man symbol; men's restroom
U+1F6BA 🚺 WOMENS SYMBOL	🚺︎	Woman symbol; women's restroom
U+1F6C9 🛉 BOYS SYMBOL	🛉︎	
U+1F6CA 🛊 GIRLS SYMBOL	🛊︎	
U+1F6BB 🚻 RESTROOM	🚻︎	Man and woman symbol with divider; unisex restroom (Note: This symbol is often seen on an outer door leading to separate facilities behind inner doors, in which case the glyph has a dividing line separating the men and women symbols)

== See also ==
- Symbol – Something that represents an idea, process, or physical entity
  - List of symbols
- Fertility symbol – Symbols encouraging fertility
- LGBTQ symbols – Flags and symbols used by the LGBTQ community
- Miscellaneous Symbols – Unicode block
- Sex symbol – Person or character widely regarded as sexually attractive
- grammatical gender – Linguistic system of noun classification
- Semiotics – Study of signs
