= Samuel Genensky =

American computer scientist

Samuel M. Genensky (26 July 1927 in New Bedford, Massachusetts – 26 June 2009 in Santa Monica, California) was an American computer scientist, best known as an inventor for devices to assist sight-impaired persons. He was also well known for his advocacy on behalf of the blind.

== Early life and career ==
When Genensky was born, the Commonwealth of Massachusetts had a requirement that all newborn babies receive drops of dilute silver nitrate in both eyes, to prevent the possible passage of syphilis from mother to child. He received the required drops, but unfortunately the chemical had not been diluted, and both his eyes were badly burned. Three months later he was treated by Dr. Frederick H. Verhoeff, a highly regarded specialist in ophthalmology, who performed partial iridectomy on both eyes (thinking that glaucoma would otherwise occur). The result of the burns and the iridectomies was complete loss of vision in Genensky's left eye and near-blindness in the right eye (the best he ever achieved in vision testing was 20/1000).

Genensky received elementary schooling (grades 1–8) at the Sylvia Ann Howland School in New Bedford, in special classes geared to visually impaired children. When he applied to attend high school at New Bedford High School, he was directed to the Perkins Institute for the Blind instead (in Watertown, Massachusetts). He attended Perkins for one year (1940–1941), where he learned Braille. At the end of that year he applied again to attend the regular high school, and this time he was accepted (the previous superintendent had left, and the acting superintendent's sister had been Genensky's teacher at the Howland School).

Genensky entered Brown University in 1945 and graduated with a BS degree in physics. He entered Harvard University in 1950 and received an MS degree in mathematics in 1951, after which he worked for the US Bureau of Standards as a mathematician in the Fire Protection Section of the Building Technology Division.

Genensky returned to Brown University in 1954 and received a Ph.D. in Applied Mathematics in 1958. At that time he was hired by the RAND Corporation and became a member of the senior staff in its Mathematics Department.

In 1976 the Santa Monica Hospital invited Genensky to come to the hospital and create a center dedicated to assisting visually impaired persons to remain (or become) an integral part of the overall society. He (along with two colleagues) did make the move, and in 1978 the Center for the Partially Sighted began providing services as part of the hospital's operations (it became an independent organization in April 1983).

== Development of sight-assisting devices ==
In his one year at Perkins, Genensky quickly learned to read Braille, but also continued to read regular printed materials, and to write with pens. One teacher told him, "Why don't you act like a well-behaved blind child?" to which he replied, "Because I am not blind." He remarked later that this retort had significant importance in his life because by it he permanently placed himself in the camp of the sighted and not in the camp of the blind, and at that point he determined to make it in life "using everything [he] had going for [him] including [his] none-too impressive residual vision."

During his first year at the regular high school Genensky took his father's World War I binoculars to his geometry class, and realized he could use them to identify circles and triangles on the blackboard. He continued to use them, encouraged by his teacher to do so. Shortly afterward, he was encouraged by Dr. Kenneth Ogel at the Dartmouth Eye Institute to place a +3.5 diopter lens on the left objective lens of the bifocals. This created a "giant bifocal system" which allowed him to see the blackboard through the right side, then use the left side to write down what he had seen. He used this system throughout the rest of his schooling, and also while employed at the Bureau of Standards and at RAND.

While at Brown University, he asked for one concession due to his limited vision: that he be allowed to take his tests in a room that had good lighting, with a chair and desk of acceptable height (he demanded that the times allowed for his testing be the same as those for the other students).

While working at RAND a co-worker, Paul Baran found Genensky slumped over an inclined drawing board while writing a company project. Baran remarked that "there has to be a better way for you to read and write." Genensky agreed and asked Baran to help him find that better way. Eventually, with additional help from other colleagues at RAND, The Aerospace Corporation, and the Polaroid Corporation, the designed and built the first practical closed-circuit television for the partially sighted, which was first demonstrated at the December 1968 annual conference of the American Academy of Optometry. A January 1971 article in Reader's Digest described the system ("Sam Genensky's Marvelous Seeing Machine"), which brought a flood of interest, and which sparked in Genensky a desire to create a center that would provide sight-impaired persons the necessary services to meet their special needs, and to encourage them to use all their senses (including any available eyesight) to remain an integral part of the human society. It was this new desire that led him to the Santa Monica Hospital and the eventual establishment of the Center for the Partially Sighted.

== Personal ==
Genensky was born into a Jewish family, and remained active in the American Jewish community for his entire life. He was married twice, first to Marion Malis Genensky who died and then again to Nancy Cronig. and had 2 children with his first wife and 4 step children from Nancy's previous marriage.

In 1990 a cataract operation dramatically improved the vision in his right eye (this is when he was stunned to realize that his wife Nancy was red-headed, not brunette as he had assumed for his entire marriage to that point), but the improvement was short-lived, and he was soon using Braille again.

Genensky was inaugurated into the California Governors Hall of Fame for People with Disabilities, received a Doctor of Human Letters honorary degree from the Illinois College of Optometry, received the Migel Award from the American Foundation for the Blind, and received the Carl Koch Award from the American Optometric Association. His name is inscribed on a brick in the Museum of the American Printing House for the Blind's Wall of Tribute in Louisville, Kentucky.

Genensky-designed standard restroom signs in California

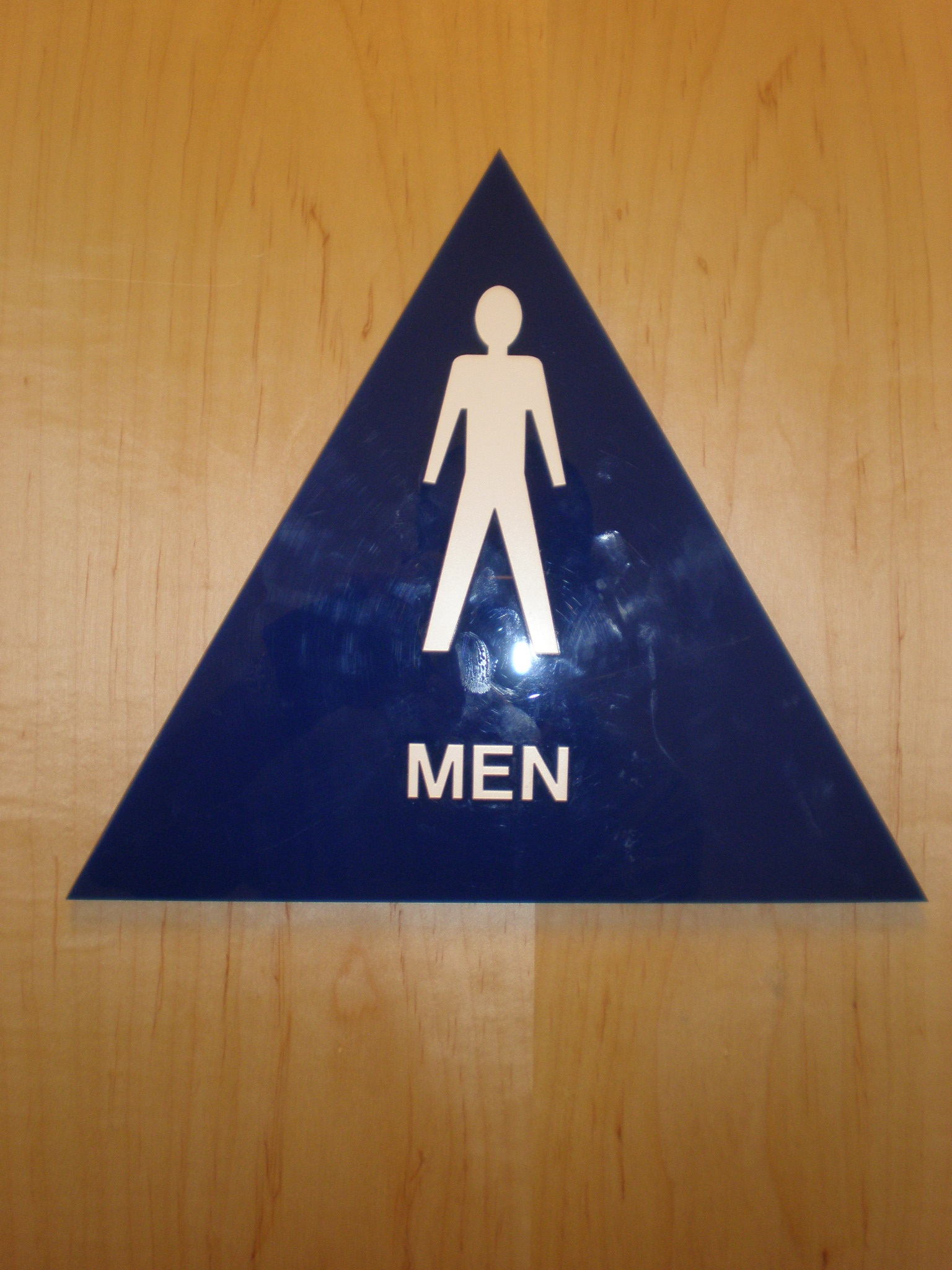
Men's restrooms are marked by triangular signs.

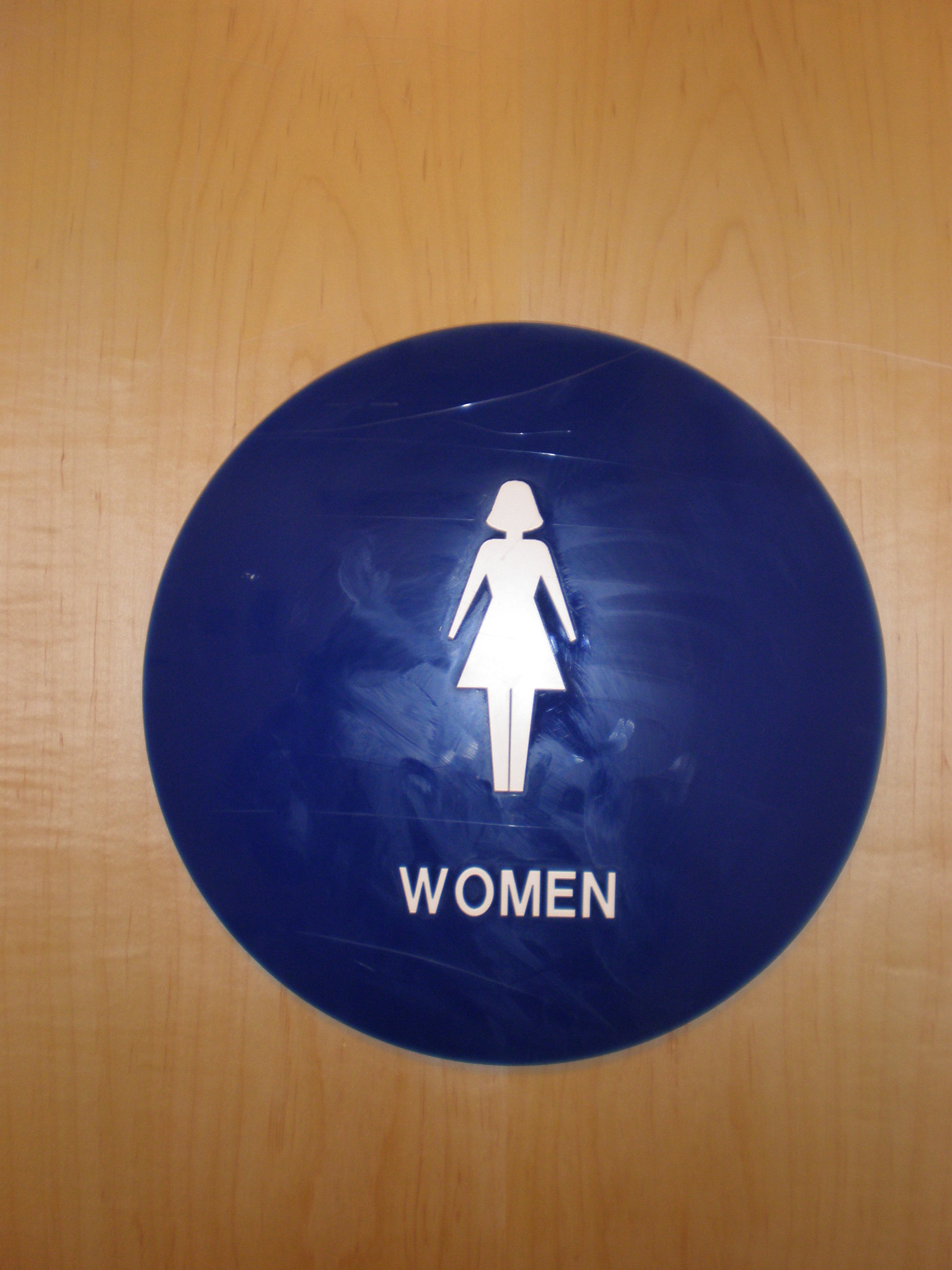
Women's restrooms are marked by circular signs.

Genensky was proud of an achievement which he claims helps vision-impaired daily while negotiating public areas: he encouraged supervisors of California's public buildings to add raised circular or triangle-shaped markings to women's or men's restroom doors, respectively, so by touch a person can determine which restroom is for which gender.

Genensky died at his Santa Monica home on 26 June 2009, of complications from heart disease.

Sam was survived by his wife Nancy, his two daughters, three step-children as well as three grandchildren.
