= Blindsight =

Visual response in some blind people

Blindsight is the ability of people who are cortically blind to respond to visual stimuli that they do not consciously see due to lesions in the primary visual cortex, also known as the striate cortex or Brodmann Area 17. The term was coined by Lawrence Weiskrantz and his colleagues in a paper published in a 1974 issue of Brain. A previous paper studying the discriminatory capacity of a cortically blind patient was published in Nature in 1973.

The assumed existence of blindsight is controversial, with some arguing that it is merely degraded conscious vision.

== Type classification ==
The majority of studies on blindsight are conducted on patients who are hemianopic (i.e. blind in one-half of their visual field) due to the destruction of the left or right striate cortex. Patients are asked to detect, localize, and discriminate amongst visual stimuli that are presented to their blind side, often in a forced-response or guessing situation, even though they may not consciously recognize the visual stimulus. Research shows that such blind patients may achieve a higher accuracy than would be expected from chance alone.

Type 1 blindsight is the term given to this ability to guess—at levels significantly above chance—aspects of a visual stimulus (such as location or type of movement) without any conscious awareness of any stimuli. Type 2 blindsight occurs when patients claim to have a feeling that there has been a change within their blind area—e.g. movement—but that it was not a visual percept. The re-classification of blindsight into Type 1 and Type 2 was made after it was shown that the most celebrated blindsight patient, "GY", was usually conscious of stimuli presented to his blind field if the stimuli had certain specific characteristics, namely being of high contrast and moving fast (at speeds in excess of 20 degrees field of view per second).

In the aftermath of the First World War, a neurologist, George Riddoch, had described patients who had been blinded by gunshot wounds to V1, who could not see stationary objects but who were, as he reported, "conscious" of seeing moving objects in their blind field. It is for this reason that the phenomenon has more recently also been called the Riddoch syndrome.

Since then it has become apparent that such subjects can also become aware of visual stimuli belonging to other visual domains, such as color and luminance, when presented to their blind fields. The ability of such hemianopic subjects to become consciously aware of stimuli presented to their blind field is also commonly referred to as "residual" or "degraded" vision.

As originally defined, blindsight challenged the common belief that perceptions must enter consciousness to affect our behavior, by showing that our behavior can be guided by sensory information of which we have no conscious awareness. Since the demonstration that blind patients can experience some visual stimuli consciously, and the consequent redefinition of blindsight into Type 1 and Type 2, a more nuanced view of the phenomenon has developed. Blindsight may be thought of as a converse of the form of anosognosia known as Anton syndrome, in which there is full cortical blindness along with the confabulation of visual experience.

== History ==
Much of our current understanding of blindsight can be attributed to early experiments on monkeys. One monkey, named Helen, could be considered the "star monkey in visual research" because she was the original blindsight subject. Helen was a macaque monkey that had been decorticated; specifically, her primary visual cortex (V1) was completely removed, blinding her. Nevertheless, under certain specific situations, Helen exhibited sighted behavior. Her pupils would dilate and she would blink at stimuli that threatened her eyes. Furthermore, under certain experimental conditions, she could detect a variety of visual stimuli, such as the presence and location of objects, as well as shape, pattern, orientation, motion, and color. In many cases, she was able to navigate her environment and interact with objects as if she were sighted.

A similar phenomenon was also discovered in humans. Subjects who had suffered damage to their visual cortices due to accidents or strokes reported partial or total blindness. Despite this, when prompted they could "guess" the presence and details of objects with above-average accuracy and, much like animal subjects, could catch objects tossed at them. The subjects never developed any kind of confidence in their abilities. Even when told of their successes, they would not begin to spontaneously make "guesses" about objects, but instead still required prompting. Furthermore, blindsight subjects rarely express the amazement about their abilities that sighted people would expect them to express.

== Describing blindsight ==
Patients with blindsight have damage to the system that produces visual perception (the visual cortex of the brain and some of the nerve fibers that bring information to it from the eyes) rather than to the underlying brain system controlling eye movements. The phenomenon was originally thought to show how, after the more complex perception system is damaged, people can use the underlying control system to guide hand movements towards an object even though they cannot see what they are reaching for. Hence, visual information can control behavior without producing a conscious sensation. This ability of those with blindsight to act as if able to see objects that they are unconscious of suggested that consciousness is not a general property of all parts of the brain, but is produced by specialized parts of it.

Blindsight patients show awareness of single visual features, such as edges and motion, but cannot gain a holistic visual percept. This suggests that perceptual awareness is modular and that—in sighted individuals—there is a "binding process that unifies all information into a whole percept", which is interrupted in patients with such conditions as blindsight and visual agnosia. Therefore, object identification and object recognition are thought to be separate processes and occur in different areas of the brain, working independently from one another. The modular theory of object perception and integration would account for the "hidden perception" experienced in blindsight patients. Research has shown that visual stimuli with the single visual features of sharp borders, sharp onset/offset times, motion and low spatial frequency contribute to, but are not strictly necessary for, an object's salience in blindsight.

== Cause ==
There are multiple theories about what causes blindsight. The first states that after damage to area V1, other branches of the optic nerve deliver visual information to the superior colliculus, pulvinar and several other areas, including parts of the cerebral cortex. In turn, these areas might then control the blindsight responses.

Another explanation for the phenomenon of blindsight is that even though the majority of a person's visual cortex may be damaged, tiny islands of functioning tissue remain. These islands are not large enough to provide conscious perception, but nevertheless enough for some unconscious visual perception.

A third theory is that the information required to determine the distance to and velocity of an object in object space is determined by the lateral geniculate nucleus (LGN) before the information is projected to the visual cortex. In a normal subject, these signals are used to merge the information from the eyes into a three-dimensional representation (which includes the position and velocity of individual objects relative to the organism), extract a vergence signal to benefit the precision (previously auxiliary) optical system, and extract a focus control signal for the lenses of the eyes. The stereoscopic information is attached to the object information passed to the visual cortex.

More recently, with the demonstration of a direct input from the LGN to area V5 (MT), which delivers signals from fast moving stimuli at latencies of about 30 ms, another explanation has emerged. This one proposes that the delivery of these signals is sufficient to arouse a conscious experience of fast visual motion, without implying that it is V5 alone that is responsible, since once signals reach V5, they may be propagated to other areas of the brain. The latter account would seem to exclude the possibility that signals are "pre-processed" by V1 or "post-processed" by it (through return connections from V5 back to V1), as has been suggested. The pulvinar nucleus of the thalamus also sends direct, V1 by-passing, signals to V5 but their precise role in generating a conscious visual experience of motion has not yet been determined.

Evidence of blindsight can be indirectly observed in children as young as two months, although there is difficulty in determining the type in a patient who is not old enough to answer questions.

== Research ==
Lawrence Weiskrantz and colleagues showed in the early 1970s that if forced to guess about whether a stimulus is present in their blind field, some observers do better than chance. This ability to detect stimuli that the observer is not conscious of can extend to discrimination of the type of stimulus (for example, whether an 'X' or 'O' has been presented in the blind field).

Electrophysiological evidence from the late 1970s has shown that there is no direct retinal input from S-cones to the superior colliculus, implying that the perception of color information should be impaired. However, more recent evidence point to a pathway from S-cones to the superior colliculus, opposing previous research and supporting the idea that some chromatic processing mechanisms are intact in blindsight.

Patients shown images on their blind side of people expressing emotions correctly guessed the emotion most of the time. The movement of facial muscles used in smiling and frowning were measured and reacted in ways that matched the kind of emotion in the unseen image. Therefore, the emotions were recognized without involving conscious sight.

A study reported in 2008 asked patient GY to misstate where in his visual field a distinctive stimulus was presented. If the stimulus was in the upper part of his visual field, he was to say it was in the lower part, and vice versa. He was able to misstate, as requested, in his left visual field (with normal conscious vision); but he tended to fail in the task—to state the location correctly—when the stimulus was in his blindsight (right) visual field. This failure rate worsened when the stimulus was clearer, indicating that failure was not simply due to unreliability of blindsight.

=== Evidence in animals ===
In a 1995 experiment, researchers attempted to show that monkeys with lesions in or even wholly removed striate cortexes also experienced blindsight. To study this, they had the monkeys complete tasks similar to those commonly used for human subjects. The monkeys were placed in front of a monitor and taught to indicate whether a stationary object or nothing was present in their visual field when a tone was played. Then the monkeys performed the same task except the stationary objects were presented outside of their visual field. The monkeys performed very similar to human participants and were unable to perceive the presence of stationary objects outside of their visual field.

Another 1995 study by the same group sought to prove that monkeys could also be conscious of movement in their deficit visual field despite not being consciously aware of the presence of an object there. To do this, researchers used another standard test for humans which was similar to the previous study except moving objects were presented in the deficit visual field. Starting from the center of the deficit visual field, the object would either move up, down, or to the right. The monkeys performed identically to humans on the test, getting them right almost every time. This showed that the monkey's ability to detect movement is separate from their ability to consciously detect an object in their deficit visual field, and gave further evidence for the claim that damage to the striate cortex plays a large role in causing the disorder.

Several years later, another study compared and contrasted the data collected from monkeys and that of a specific human patient with blindsight, GY. His striate cortical region was damaged through trauma at the age of eight, though for the most part he retained full functionality, GY was not consciously aware of anything in his right visual field. In the monkeys, the striate cortex of the left hemisphere was surgically removed. By comparing the test results of both GY and the monkeys, the researchers concluded that similar patterns of responses to stimuli in the "blind" visual field can be found in both species.

=== Case studies ===
==== "DB" ====
Researchers applied the same type of tests that were used to study blindsight in animals to a patient referred to as "DB". The normal techniques used to assess visual acuity in humans involved asking them to verbally describe some visually recognizable aspect of an object or objects. DB was given forced-choice tasks to complete instead. The results of DB's guesses showed that DB was able to determine shape and detect movement at some unconscious level, despite not being visually aware of this. DB himself chalked up the accuracy of his guesses to be merely coincidental.

The discovery of the condition known as blindsight raised questions about how different types of visual information, even unconscious information, may be affected and sometimes even unaffected by damage to different areas of the visual cortex. Previous studies had already demonstrated that even without conscious awareness of visual stimuli, humans could still determine certain visual features such as presence in the visual field, shape, orientation and movement. But, in a newer study evidence showed that if damage to the visual cortex occurs in areas above the primary visual cortex, the conscious awareness of visual stimuli itself is not damaged. Blindsight shows that even when the primary visual cortex is damaged or removed a person can still perform actions guided by unconscious visual information. Despite damage occurring in the area necessary for conscious awareness of visual information, other functions of the processing of these visual percepts are still available to the individual. The same also goes for damage to other areas of the visual cortex. If an area of the cortex that is responsible for a certain function is damaged, it will only result in the loss of that particular function or aspect, functions that other parts of the visual cortex are responsible for remain intact.

==== Alexander and Cowey ====
Alexander and Cowey investigated how contrasting stimuli brightness affects blindsight patients' ability to discern movement. Prior studies have already shown that blindsight patients are able to detect motion even though they claim they do not see any visual percepts in their blind fields. The study subjects were two patients who suffered from hemianopsia—blindness in more than half of their visual field. Both subjects had displayed the ability to accurately determine the presence of visual stimuli in their blind hemifields without acknowledging an actual visual percept previously.

To test the effect of brightness on the subject's ability to determine motion they used a white background with a series of colored dots. The contrast of the brightness of the dots compared to the white background was altered in each trial to determine if the participants performed better or worse when there was a larger discrepancy in brightness or not. The subjects focused on the display for two equal length time intervals and were asked whether they thought the dots were moving during the first or the second time interval.

When the contrast in brightness between the background and the dots was higher, both of the subjects could discern motion more accurately than they would have statistically through guesswork. However, one subject was not able to accurately determine whether or not blue dots were moving regardless of the brightness contrast, but he/she was able to do so with every other color dot. When the contrast was highest, subjects were able to tell whether or not the dots were moving with very high rates of accuracy. Even when the dots were white, but still of a different brightness from the background, subjects could still determine whether they were moving. But, regardless of the dots' color, subjects could not tell when they were in motion when the white background and the dots were of similar brightness.

==== Kentridge, Heywood, and Weiskrantz ====
Kentridge, Heywood, and Weiskrantz used the phenomenon of blindsight to investigate the connection between visual attention and visual awareness. They wanted to see if their subject—who exhibited blindsight in other studies—could react more quickly when their attention was cued without the ability to be visually aware of it. The researchers aimed to show that being conscious of a stimulus and paying attention to it was not the same thing.

To test the relationship between attention and awareness, they had the participant try to determine where a target was and whether it was oriented horizontally or vertically on a computer screen. The target line would appear at one of two different locations and would be oriented in one of two directions. Before the target would appear an arrow would become visible on the screen, sometimes pointing to the correct position of the target line and less frequently not. This arrow was the cue for the subject. The participant would press a key to indicate whether the line was horizontal or vertical, and could then also indicate to an observer whether or not he/she actually had a feeling that any object was there or not—even if they couldn't see anything. The participant was able to accurately determine the orientation of the line when the target was cued by an arrow before the appearance of the target, even though these visual stimuli did not equal awareness in the subject who had no vision in that area of his/her visual field. The study showed that even without the ability to be visually aware of a stimulus the participant could still focus his/her attention on this object.

==== "CB" and "SJ" ====
Two separate studies involving the blindsighted patients "CB" and "SJ" both showed that visually guided action can occur in the absence of conscious perception. CB, a 75-year-old man blind on his left side, was asked to reach with his hand towards a target while avoiding various obstacles. These were placed on both his blind side and his sighted side. Despite reporting no awareness of the placement (or even presence) of the obstacles on the blind side, he was able complete each trial without bumping into a single object. Similarly, SJ, a 37-year-old woman blind on her right side, was presented with objects on both sides of her vision and asked to grab them. Even when she couldn't see the object, she proved able to scale her grasp accurately. Crucially, in both studies the task was then altered slightly, introducing a two second delay between when the objects were shown and when the participants completed the task. Their prior ability to react to unseen objects completely disappeared, and they ceased to exhibit any signs of blindsight, though their performance remained mainly unaffected when it came to objects on their sighted side.

Some scientists have argued that the dorsal pathway dedicated to "vision-for-action" does not store information; rather, actions are coordinated in real-time based on the visual information being received at that very moment. This would explain why CB and SJ were able to react to visual information presented on their blind side in real-time but not after a delay. Indeed, a conclusion of the SJ study was that action based on memory seems to rely on the ventral pathway involved in perception, in a way that action based on objects in our direct line of sight does not. This was backed up by an fMRI study in which ventral stream activation usually linked to visual perception was activated by actions carried out after an 18-s delay, despite the participants being in complete darkness.

==== "TN" ====
A potential weak point of case studies like the ones above is that the participants were not completely blind, and therefore it is not out of the question that their existing vision could have assisted them in some way. So a particularly noteworthy patient is a man known as "TN", who suffered two strokes at age 52 that resulted in the destruction of the primary visual cortex (V1) in both hemispheres of the brain, and hence complete loss of (conscious) sight. In one famous case, researchers persuaded TN to walk down an obstacle-filled hallway, without his cane or any prior knowledge of the layout. He was able to navigate the full length of the hallway without hitting a single object, at one point even hugging the wall to get past a trashcan.

TN has taken part in a number of other experiments looking at blindsight. In one early study, he was shown images of expressive faces. While he could not guess the gender or shape accurately, he correctly guessed what emotion was shown at an above chance level. Brain imaging showed significant activity in the right amygdala, particularly in response to fearful faces, suggesting that the brain can unconsciously process expressions of emotion.

Similarly, another experiment investigated the brain's sensitivity to looming stimuli, which often indicate an incoming collision. This sensitivity can involve heightened attention capture, but is also thought to operate on a subconscious level, and has been observed in monkeys and infants. In the experiment, both TN and a group of control participants were shown a series of moving red dots, some of which made looming motions. An fMRI scan of the control group showed that the movement of the dots produced normal activation in the middle temporal visual area (V5), known for its role in motion processing. In TN, activation was found in response to both general motion and to looming in particular; notably, however, this occurred primarily in areas of the brain not associated with motion processing in healthy individuals. Given that the specific V5 areas activated in the control participants were mostly lesioned in TN, this unusual activation seems to be a result of cortical plasticity.

==== Other cases ====
Other cases refer to SL, GY and GR.

== Brain regions involved ==
Visual processing in the brain goes through a series of stages. Destruction of the primary visual cortex leads to blindness in the part of the visual field that corresponds to the damaged cortical representation. The area of blindness – known as a scotoma – is in the visual field opposite the damaged hemisphere and can vary from a small area up to the entire hemifield. Visual processing occurs in the brain in a hierarchical series of stages (with much crosstalk and feedback between areas). The route from the retina through V1 is not the only visual pathway into the cortex, though it is by far the largest; it is commonly thought that the residual performance of people exhibiting blindsight is due to preserved pathways into the extrastriate cortex that bypass V1. However both physiological evidence in monkeys and behavioral and imaging evidence in humans shows that activity in these extrastriate areas, and especially in V5, is apparently sufficient to support visual awareness in the absence of V1.

To put it in a more complex way, recent physiological findings suggest that visual processing takes place along several independent, parallel pathways. One system processes information about shape, one about color, and one about movement, location and spatial organization. This information moves through an area of the brain called the lateral geniculate nucleus, located in the thalamus, and on to be processed in the primary visual cortex, area V1 (also known as the striate cortex because of its striped appearance). People with damage to V1 report no conscious vision, no visual imagery, and no visual images in their dreams. However, some of these people still experience the blindsight phenomenon, though this too is controversial, with some studies showing a limited amount of consciousness without V1 or projections relating to it.

The superior colliculus and prefrontal cortex also have a major role in awareness of a visual stimulus.

=== Lateral geniculate nucleus ===
Mosby's Dictionary of Medicine, Nursing & Health Professions defines the LGN as "one of two elevations of the lateral posterior thalamus receiving visual impulses from the retina via the optic nerves and tracts and relaying the impulses to the calcarine (visual) cortex".

What is seen in the left and right visual field is taken in by each eye and brought back to the optic disc via the nerve fibres of the retina. From the optic disc, visual information travels through the optic nerve and into the optic chiasm. Visual information then enters the optic tract and travels to four different areas of the brain including the superior colliculus, pretectum of the mid brain, the suprachiasmatic nucleus of the hypothalamus, and the lateral geniculate nucleus (LGN). Most axons from the LGN will then travel to the primary visual cortex.

Injury to the primary visual cortex, including lesions and other trauma, leads to the loss of visual experience. However, the residual vision that is left cannot be attributed to V1. According to Schmid et al., "thalamic lateral geniculate nucleus has a causal role in V1-independent processing of visual information". This information was found through experiments using fMRI during activation and inactivation of the LGN and the contribution the LGN has on visual experience in monkeys with a V1 lesion. These researchers concluded that the magnocellular system of the LGN is less affected by the removal of V1, which suggests that it is because of this system in the LGN that blindsight occurs. Furthermore, once the LGN was inactivated, virtually all of the extrastriate areas of the brain no longer showed a response on the fMRI. The information leads to a qualitative assessment that included "scotoma stimulation, with the LGN intact had fMRI activation of ~20% of that under normal conditions". This finding agrees with the information obtained from, and fMRI images of, patients with blindsight. The same study also supported the conclusion that the LGN plays a substantial role in blindsight. Specifically, while injury to V1 does create a loss of vision, the LGN is less affected and may result in the residual vision that remains, causing the "sight" in blindsight.

Functional magnetic resonance imaging has also been employed to conduct brain scans in normal, healthy human volunteers to attempt to demonstrate that visual motion can bypass V1, through a connection from the LGN to the human middle temporal complex. The experimeters concluded that there was an indeed a connection of visual motion information that went directly from the LGN to the V5/hMT+ bypassing V1 completely. Evidence also suggests that, following a traumatic injury to V1, there is still a direct pathway from the retina through the LGN to the extrastriate visual areas. The extrastriate visual areas include parts of the occipital lobe that surround V1. In non-human primates, these often include V2, V3, and V4.

In a study conducted in primates, after partial ablation of area V1, areas V2 and V3 were still excited by visual stimulus. Other evidence suggests that "the LGN projections that survive V1 removal are relatively sparse in density, but are nevertheless widespread and probably encompass all extrastriate visual areas," including V2, V4, V5 and the inferotemporal cortex region.

== Controversy ==
The results of some experiments suggest that blindsighted people may be preserving some kind of conscious experience and thus they are not fully blind. The criteria for blindsight has repeatedly changed based on findings that challenge the original definition, which has led some scientists to cast doubt on the existence of blindsight.

== See also ==
- Koniocellular cell
- Riddoch syndrome
- Two-streams hypothesis
- Visual agnosia
