= Suboccipital puncture =

Rare procedure to collect cerebrospinal fluid

Suboccipital puncture (cisternal puncture)
- ICD-9-CM: 01.0

A suboccipital puncture or cisternal puncture is a diagnostic procedure that can be performed in order to collect a sample of cerebrospinal fluid (CSF) for biochemical, microbiological, and cytological analysis, or rarely to relieve increased intracranial pressure. It is done by inserting a needle through the skin below the external occipital protuberance into the cisterna magna and is an alternative to lumbar puncture. Indications for its use are limited. Subarachnoid hemorrhage and direct puncture of brain tissue are the most common major complications. Fluoroscopic guidance decreases the risk for complications. The use of this procedure in humans was first described by Ayer in 1920.

This is an exceedingly rare procedure. When CSF cannot be obtained from the lumbar space (and when its analysis is considered critical to treatment), a cisternal tap may be required. The needle is placed in the midline, passing just under the occipital bone, into the (usually large) cisterna magna (Fig. 23-2). This is technically fairly easy; however, if the needle is advanced too far it can enter the medulla, sometimes causing sudden respiratory arrest and death. The test should therefore be carried out only by experienced physicians (usually neurosurgeons or neuroradiologists). An alternative route that may be used by neurosurgeons and neuroradiologists is lateral to C-1 with penetration through the large C-1 intervertebral hiatus.

The cisternal tap may be used in myelography when the upper margin of a spinal block needs to be defined; however, magnetic resonance imaging (MRI) has become the procedure of choice for defining the upper and lower limits of spinal cord or spinal cord-compressing lesions. It is necessary at times in the intrathecal administration of irritating medications, such as amphotericin B. Medications are diluted more rapidly in the larger and more rapidly circulating volume of cisterna magna than in the smaller lumbar sac.

== See also ==
- Lumbar puncture
