= Riddoch syndrome =

Type of visual impairment

- Specialty: Neurology

Riddoch syndrome is a term coined by Zeki and Ffytche (1998) in a paper published in the scientific journal Brain. The term acknowledges the work of George Riddoch who was the first to describe a condition in which a form of visual impairment, caused by lesions in the occipital lobe, leaves the sufferer blind but able to distinguish visual stimuli with specific characteristics when these appear in the patient's blind field. The most common stimuli that can be perceived consciously are the presence and direction of fast moving objects (moving at a speed in excess of 10 degrees per second); in his work these moving objects were described as "vague and shadowy". Riddoch concluded from his observations that "movement may be recognized as a special visual perception". The syndrome is believed by some researchers to be identical to type 2 blindsight.

Riddoch's description was dismissed by Sir Gordon Holmes in a 1918 paper in which he wrote that "The condition described by Riddoch should not be spoken of as a dissociation of the elements of visual sensation" because "occipital lesions do not produce true dissociations of function with intact retinal sensibility". The idea of a separate representation of visual motion was further dismissed by H.L. Teuber and, in general, such an idea was not accepted until physiological studies in with rhesus monkeys demonstrated the existence of a cortical area lying outside the primary visual cortex (area V1) in which almost all cells were selective for directional motion. With that new knowledge, a new study of patient GY, who had been used extensively to demonstrate the phenomenon of blindsight (that is to say the ability to discriminate correctly visual stimuli presented to the blind field without conscious awareness) led to interesting findings. The re-examination showed that, when presented with fast-moving, high contrast, visual stimuli in his blind field, he could discriminate their presence and direction of motion consciously. This, in turn, led to a re-classification of blindsight into Type 1 and Type 2 the former adhering to the previous definition of blindsight while the latter acknowledging the fact that the experience of such subjects can be conscious even if much degraded.

Only moving objects in the scotoma are visible, static ones being invisible to the patient. The moving objects are not perceived to have color or detail. The subject may only have awareness of the movement without visual perception of it (gnosanopsia), or the general shape of a moving object may be perceivable as a shadow-like outline. The syndrome is named after George Riddoch who had been a temporary officer in the Royal Army Medical Corps and examined soldiers who were blinded by gunshot wounds to their brains.

At least one patient was able to use a rocking chair—putting non-moving surroundings in relative motion to her head—to improve her motion perception. She eventually was able to do the same with movement of her head.

== See also ==
- Blindsight – Visual response in some blind people
- Visual agnosia – Impairment in recognition of visually presented objects
