= Tocopherol O-methyltransferase =

Identifiers
- EC no.: 2.1.1.95
- CAS no.: 84788-82-9

Databases
- IntEnz: IntEnz view
- BRENDA: BRENDA entry
- ExPASy: NiceZyme view
- KEGG: KEGG entry
- MetaCyc: metabolic pathway
- PRIAM: profile
- PDB structures: RCSB PDB PDBe PDBsum
- Gene Ontology: AmiGO / QuickGO
Search
- PMC: articles
- PubMed: articles
- NCBI: proteins

Tocopherol O-methyltransferase (EC 2.1.1.95) is an enzyme that catalyzes the chemical reaction

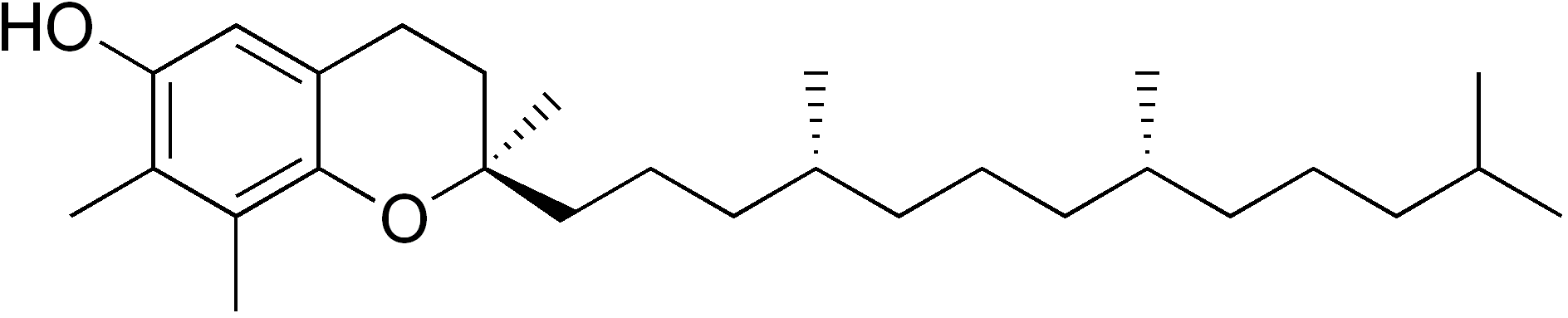
γ-Tocopherol
+ SAM
α-Tocopherol
+ SAH

This is a methylation reaction in which one of the vitamin E components, γ-tocopherol, is converted to the more commonly found α-tocopherol. The methyl group comes from the cofactor, S-adenosyl methionine (SAM), which becomes S-adenosyl-L-homocysteine (SAH).

The enzymes from Arabidopsis thaliana and Capsicum annuum can also convert δ-tocopherol into β-tocopherol and are effective on tocotrienols, by addition of a methyl group at the same relative position as in γ-tocopherol.

This enzyme belongs to the family of transferases, specifically those transferring one-carbon group methyltransferases. The systematic name of this enzyme class is S-adenosyl-L-methionine:gamma-tocopherol 5-O-methyltransferase. This enzyme is also called gamma-tocopherol methyltransferase.
