= C28H42O2 =

The molecular formula C_{28}H_{42}O_{2} (molar mass: 410.63 g/mol, exact mass: 410.3185 u) may refer to:

- Tocotrienols
  - β-Tocotrienol
  - γ-Tocotrienol
