= C29H50O2 =

The molecular formula C_{29}H_{50}O_{2} (molar mass: 430.70 g/mol, exact mass: 430.3811 u) may refer to:

- Tocopherol (TCP)
- α-Tocopherol
