= Tocofersolan =

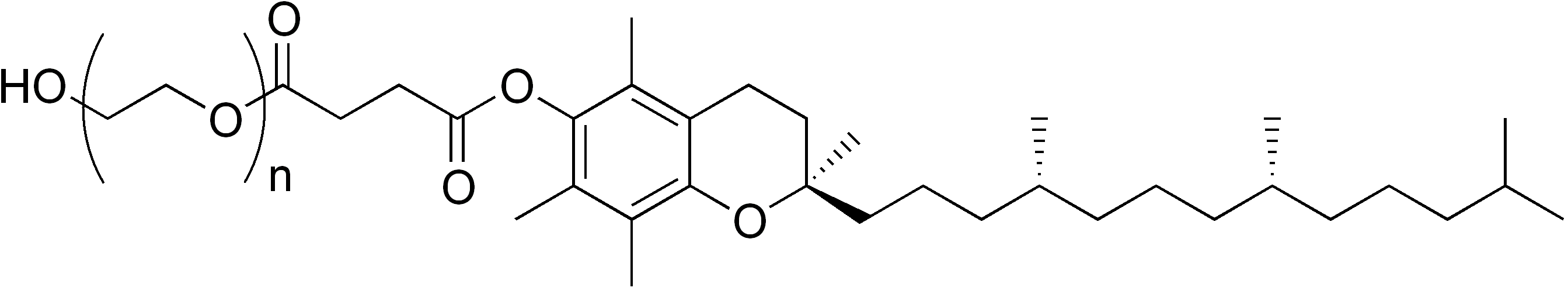

Names
- IUPAC name α-Hydro-ω-{[4-oxo-4-({(2R)-2,5,7,8-tetramethyl-2-[(4R,8R)-4,8,12-trimethyltridecyl]-3,4-dihydro-2H-1-benzopyran-6-yl}oxy)butanoyl]oxy}poly(oxyethylene)
- Other names Tocofersolan; Vitamin E PEG succinate; α-Tocopherol polyethylene glycol succinate (TPGS); Liqui-E

Identifiers
CAS Number	9002-96-4
3D model (JSmol)	Interactive image
ChEMBL	ChEMBL2355578
ChemSpider	64498
DrugBank	DB11635
ECHA InfoCard	100.123.651
EC Number	618-345-6
PubChem CID	9938056
UNII	O03S90U1F2
CompTox Dashboard (EPA)	DTXSID90872278 DTXSID1048623, DTXSID90872278
- InChI: InChI=1S/C35H58O6/c1-24(2)12-9-13-25(3)14-10-15-26(4)16-11-20-35(8)21-19-30-29(7)33(27(5)28(6)34(30)41-35)40-32(38)18-17-31(37)39-23-22-36/h24-26,36H,9-23H2,1-8H3 Key: AOBORMOPSGHCAX-UHFFFAOYSA-N; InChI=1/C35H58O6/c1-24(2)12-9-13-25(3)14-10-15-26(4)16-11-20-35(8)21-19-30-29(7)33(27(5)28(6)34(30)41-35)40-32(38)18-17-31(37)39-23-22-36/h24-26,36H,9-23H2,1-8H3 Key: AOBORMOPSGHCAX-UHFFFAOYAU
- SMILES: O=C(OCCO)CCC(=O)Oc2c(c(c1OC(CCc1c2C)(C)CCCC(C)CCCC(C)CCCC(C)C)C)C

Properties
Chemical formula	(C_{2}H_{4}O)_{n}C_{33}H_{54}O_{5}
Molar mass	Variable

Pharmacology
ATC code	A11HA08 (WHO)
License data	EU EMA: by INN
- Except where otherwise noted, data are given for materials in their standard state (at 25 °C [77 °F], 100 kPa). verify (what is ?) Infobox references

Tocofersolan
Clinical data
- Trade names: Vedrop
- Other names: Tocophersolan (USAN US)
- AHFS/Drugs.com: UK Drug Information

Legal status
- Legal status: UK: POM (Prescription only); EU: Rx-only

Identifiers
- DrugBank: DB11635
- KEGG: D06174
- CompTox Dashboard (EPA): DTXSID90872278 DTXSID1048623, DTXSID90872278
- ECHA InfoCard: 100.123.651

Tocofersolan (INN; also known as tocophersolan, tocopherol polyethylene glycol succinate, or TPGS) is a synthetic water-soluble version of vitamin E. Natural forms of vitamin E are fat soluble, but not water-soluble. Tocofersolan is a polyethylene glycol (PEG) derivative of α-tocopherol succinate. The addition of PEG enables water solubility.

Tocofersolan is used as a vitamin E supplement or to treat vitamin E deficiency in individuals who cannot absorb fats due to disease. On 24 July 2009 the European Medicines Agency approved tocofersolan under the trade name Vedrop 50 mg/ml oral solution for the treatment of vitamin E deficiency due to digestive malabsorption in paediatric patients with congenital or hereditary chronic cholestasis, from birth (in term newborns) to 16 or 18 years of age (depending on the region).

Tocofersolan is also used in cosmetics and pharmaceuticals as an antioxidant.
