= Α-Tocotrienol =

α-Tocotrienol
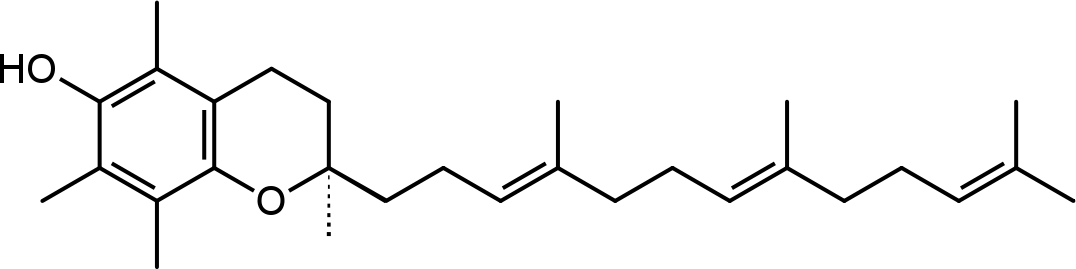

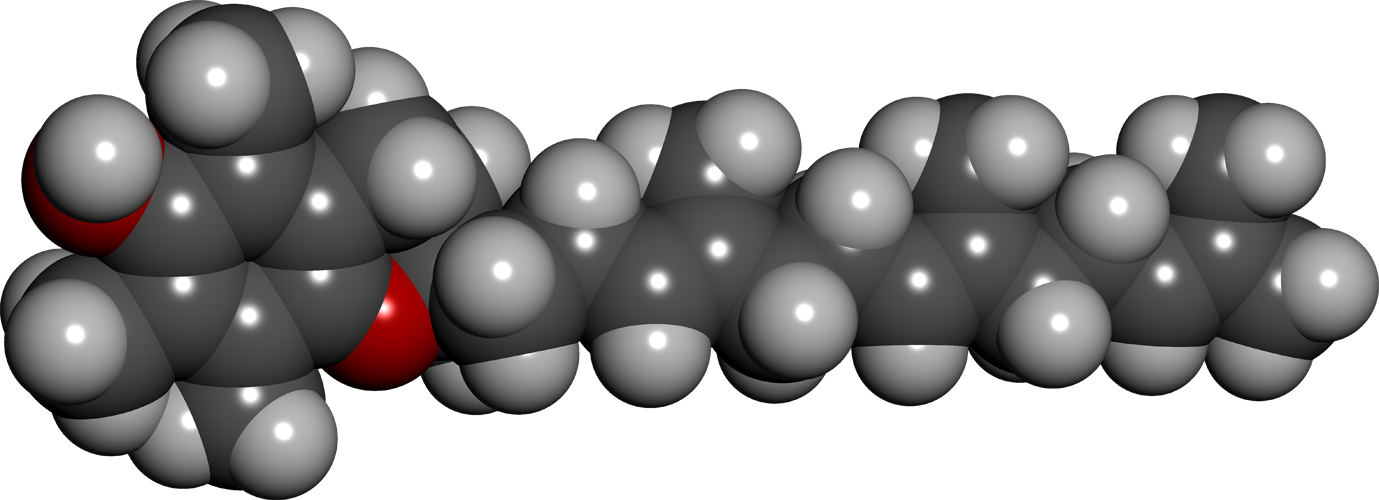

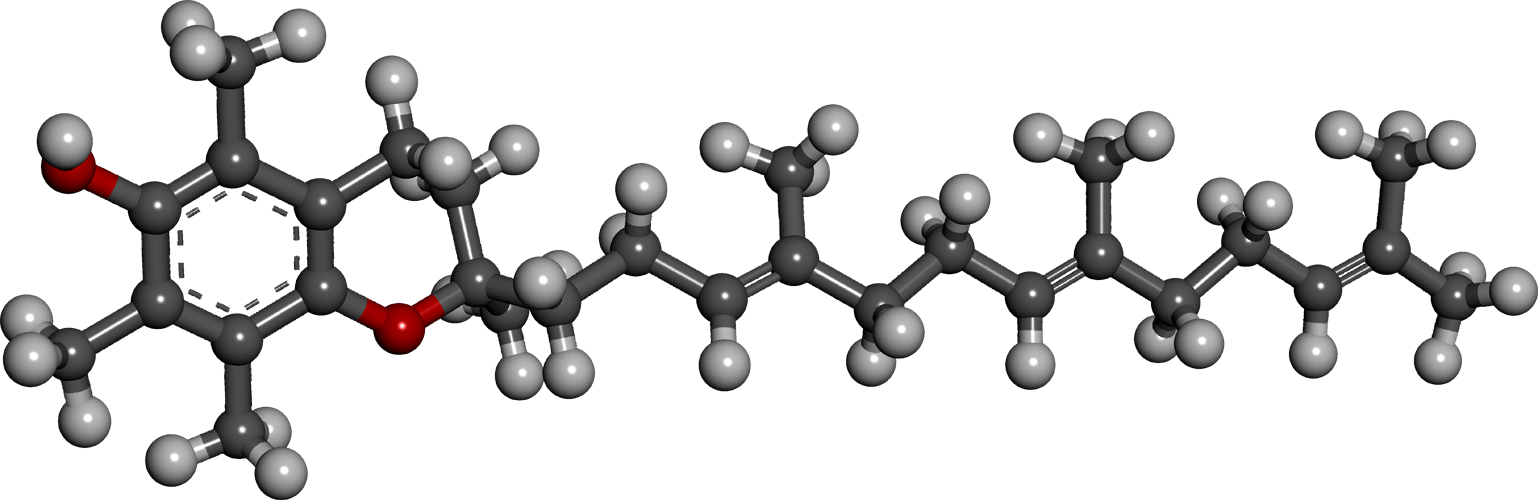

Names
- Preferred IUPAC name (2R)-2,5,7,8-Tetramethyl-2-[(3E,7E)-4,8,12-trimethyltrideca-3,7,11-trien-1-yl]-3,4-dihydro-2H-1-benzopyran-6-ol

Identifiers
| CAS Number | 58864-81-6 |
| 3D model (JSmol) | Interactive image |
| ChEBI | CHEBI:33270 |
| ChEMBL | ChEMBL120276 |
| ChemSpider | 4445512 |
| ECHA InfoCard | 100.119.974 |
| PubChem CID | 5282347 |
| UNII | B6LXL1832Y |
| CompTox Dashboard (EPA) | DTXSID901019976 |
- InChI: InChI=1S/C29H44O2/c1-20(2)12-9-13-21(3)14-10-15-22(4)16-11-18-29(8)19-17-26-25(7)27(30)23(5)24(6)28(26)31-29/h12,14,16,30H,9-11,13,15,17-19H2,1-8H3/b21-14+,22-16+/t29-/m1/s1 Key: RZFHLOLGZPDCHJ-XZXLULOTSA-N; InChI=1S/C29H44O2/c1-20(2)12-9-13-21(3)14-10-15-22(4)16-11-18-29(8)19-17-26-25(7)27(30)23(5)24(6)28(26)31-29/h12,14,16,30H,9-11,13,15,17-19H2,1-8H3/b21-14+,22-16+/t29-/m1/s1 Key: RZFHLOLGZPDCHJ-XZXLULOTSA-N
- SMILES: CC1=C(C(=C2CC[C@@](OC2=C1C)(C)CC/C=C(\C)/CC/C=C(\C)/CCC=C(C)C)C)O

Properties
| Chemical formula | C_{29}H_{44}O_{2} |
| Molar mass | 424.66 g/mol |
- Except where otherwise noted, data are given for materials in their standard state (at 25 °C [77 °F], 100 kPa). verify (what is ?) Infobox references

α-Tocotrienol is a form of tocotrienol and one of the chemical compounds that is considered vitamin E.

== See also ==
- β-Tocotrienol
- γ-Tocotrienol
- δ-Tocotrienol
