= C28H48O2 =

The molecular formula C_{28}H_{48}O_{2} (molar mass: 416.68 g/mol, exact mass: 416.3654 u) may refer to:

- β-Tocopherol
- γ-Tocopherol
