= International unit =

Pharmacological measurement unit for the amount of a biologically active substance

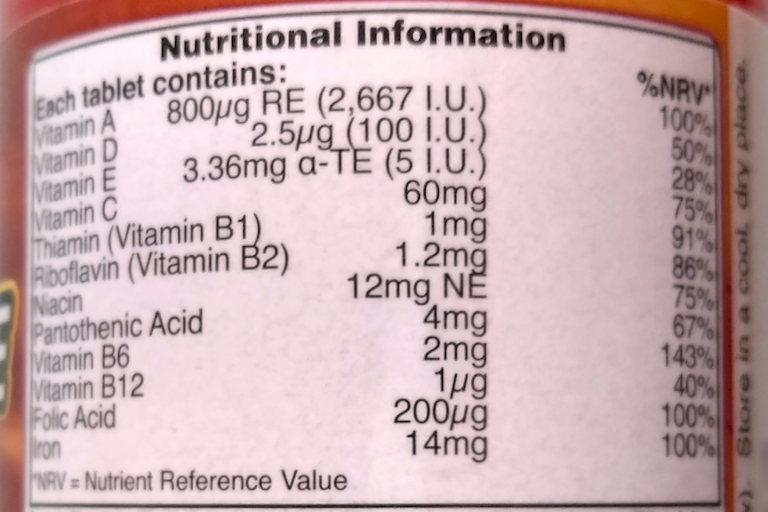
Multivitamins nutrition facts label showing that the international unit of, for example, vitamins D and E correspond to different gram values

In pharmacology, the international unit (IU) is a unit of measurement for the effect or biological activity of a substance, for the purpose of easier comparison across similar forms of substances. International units are used to quantify vitamins and biologics (hormones, some medications, vaccines, blood products and similar biologically active substances).

International units as used in pharmacology are not part of the International System of Units (SI).

== For biologic preparations ==
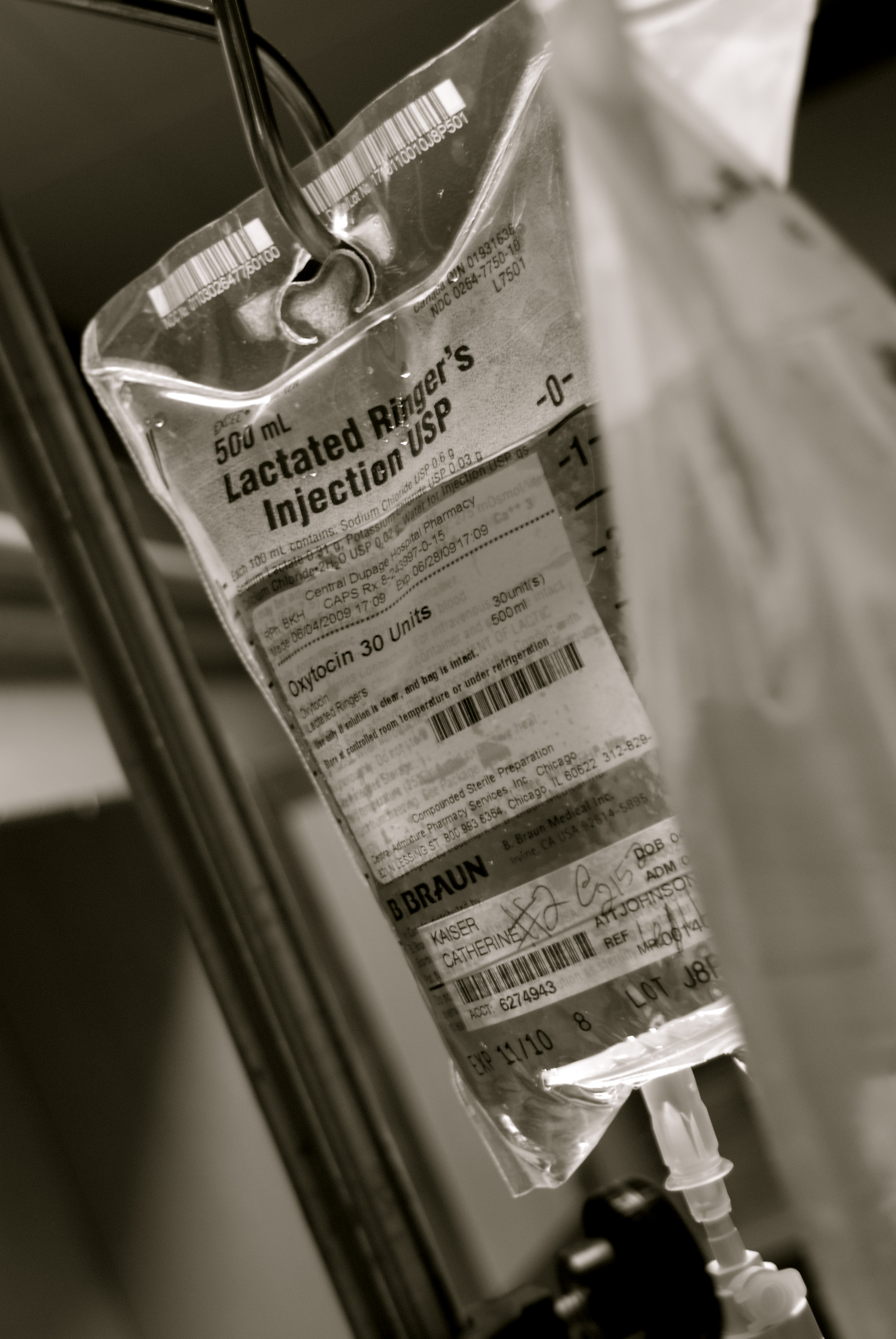
30 IU of oxytocin for intravenous infusion

Biologics are medications and other products made from biological sources. Depending on the form (powder vs solution), production method, or just batch-to-batch differences, there is often some variation in their relative potencies, so that a simple measure of mass would not suffice. The international unit allows one to compare the relative potency of all these forms, so that different forms or preparations with the same biological effect will contain the same number of IUs. To do so, the WHO Expert Committee on Biological Standardization (WHO ECBS) provides a reference preparation of the agent, arbitrarily sets the number of IUs contained in that preparation, and specifies a biological assay and/or an immunoassay procedure to compare other preparations of the same agent to the reference preparation. Since the number of IUs contained in a new substance is arbitrarily set, there is no equivalence between IU measurements of different biological agents.

=== Process of definition ===
To define the IU for a substance, an international collaborative study is organized by the WHO Expert Committee on Biological Standardization using various assay systems in several laboratories. The main goal of the study is to reach a consensus regarding methods of analysis and the approach to standardization so that results can be compared.

The study is performed using highly purified preparations of the substance, typically in lyophilized form, called international reference preparations, or IRPs. Each preparation is divided into precisely weighed samples, with each sample stored in its own ampoule labeled with a code corresponding to the source IRP. Assays are performed using these samples and are calibrated against the previously available IU standard. These results can be quite variable; the final IU value for samples of a given IRP are determined by consensus. The IRP that provides the best results and shows the best long term stability is selected to define the next IU. This IRP is then referred to as the international standard.

When a standard sample comes close to depleting, a new standard will have to be found. A new batch of the substance in question is produced and calibrated against the old one, so that the unit still represents the same amount of biological activity. Many substances have undergone several such standard sample changes. The third international standard of prolactin has nearly run out and in 2016 replacement was proposed.

=== Examples ===
- 1 IU of rhEGF is defined as the potency of 0.001 μg of a rhEGF in the "91/530" standard vial. One manufacturer reports that its rhEGF is 1.4 times as potent as the 91/530 standard.
- 12.5 IU of oxytocin is defined as the potency of 21 μg of pure peptide in the "76/575" standard vial.

Before the purification of penicillin was perfected, the amounts were also described in "International Units" (and some non-international arbitrary "units" before them) to account for batch-to-batch variation. See Penicillin § Penicillin units.

== For vitamins ==
A number of vitamins have distinct vitamers of distinct biological potencies. There is a system in place also called the international unit to describe the relative strength of these different molecular forms. Like the biological international unit, the IU for vitamins is also an arbitrary number that cannot be interconverted among different types of activities. By 1934, the WHO (then the League of Nations Health Organisation) had already defined the international units for vitamins A, B1, C, and D.

Unlike biologic preparations, small molecules like vitamins can be very easily purified to yield products that are equivalent in potency. As a result, a simple mass conversion (as opposed to an assay) suffices to obtain the IU:

- 1 IU Vitamin A = 0.3 μg retinol (~0.1 nmol) = 0.6 μg beta-carotene (Note: The IU/RE equivalency has been replaced by the RAE conversion. See Vitamin A § Equivalencies of retinoids and carotenoids (IU).)
- 1 IU Vitamin D = 0.025 μg D_{2}/D_{3} ≈ 0.65 pmol
- 1 IU Vitamin E = 2/3 mg d-alpha-tocopherol = 0.90 mg of dl-alpha-tocopherol (Note: The US NIH has replaced IU with mg d-alpha-tocopherol equiv. See Vitamin E § Food labeling.)

== History ==
In 1931, the Permanent Commission on Biological Standardisation of the League of Nations Health Organisation specified the provisional standards for vitamins A, B1, C, and D. These original standards were quite crude by modern measures: the standard for vitamin A was a mixture of many carotenoids, for vitamin B_{1} the result of adsorbing rice polishings onto fuller's earth, for vitamin C a sample of lemon juice, for vitamin D a sample of irradiated ergosterol in oil. In 1935, the standards for A, C, and D were changed to use pure substances: pure beta-carotene in oil, crystalline ascorbic acid, and crystalline ergocalciferol. This same commission also established early standards for biologics (antitoxins, insulins, pituitary extract and sex hormones) in the interwar period.

In 1944, officials from the League of Nations, in cooperation with the Royal Society, established a first international standard for penicillin. The postwar World Health Organization established a second standard in 1953. Both were defined using a pure, crystalline substance.

== Languages ==
The name international unit is often capitalized in English and other languages, although major English-language dictionaries treat it as a common noun and thus use lower case. The name has several accepted abbreviations. It is usually abbreviated as IU in English, and UI in Romance languages (for example Spanish unidad internacional, Portuguese unidade internacional, French unité internationale, Italian unità internazionale, Romanian unitate internațională), IE in several Germanic languages (for example German internationale Einheit, Dutch internationale eenheid) or as other forms (for example Russian МЕ, международная единица [mezhdunarodnaya yedinitsa], or ЕД, единица действия [yedinitsa deystviya] 'activity unit', Hungarian NE, nemzetközi egység).

In order to remove the possibility of having the letter "I" confused with the digit "1", some hospitals have it as a stated policy omit the "I", that is, to only use U or E when talking and writing about dosages, while other hospitals require the word "units" (or words "international units") to be written out entirely. (For example, "three international units per litre" may be abbreviated "3 U/L". The "liter" sign (L) is less affected, as less confusing written forms are used.)

== See also ==
- United States Pharmacopeia (USP)
