= Δ-Tocopherol =

δ-Tocopherol
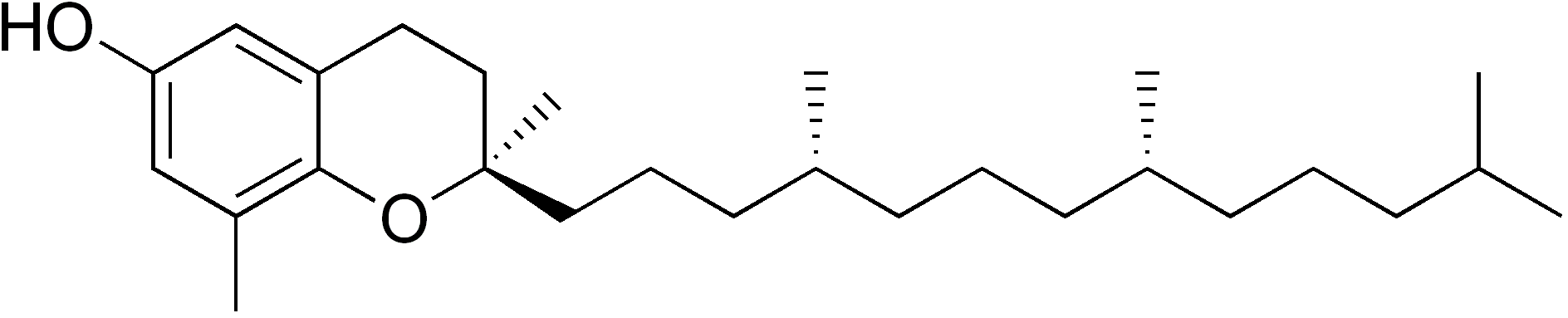

Names
- Preferred IUPAC name (2R)-2,8-Dimethyl-2-[(4R,8R)-4,8,12-trimethyltridecyl]-2H-1-benzopyran-6-ol

Identifiers
CAS Number	119-13-1
3D model (JSmol)	Interactive image
ChEBI	CHEBI:47772
ChEMBL	ChEMBL1451395
ChemSpider	83144
ECHA InfoCard	100.003.909
E number	E309 (antioxidants, ...)
PubChem CID	92094
UNII	JU84X1II0N
CompTox Dashboard (EPA)	DTXSID1046263
- InChI: InChI=1S/C27H46O2/c1-20(2)10-7-11-21(3)12-8-13-22(4)14-9-16-27(6)17-15-24-19-25(28)18-23(5)26(24)29-27/h18-22,28H,7-17H2,1-6H3/t21-,22-,27-/m1/s1 Key: GZIFEOYASATJEH-VHFRWLAGSA-N; InChI=1/C27H46O2/c1-20(2)10-7-11-21(3)12-8-13-22(4)14-9-16-27(6)17-15-24-19-25(28)18-23(5)26(24)29-27/h18-22,28H,7-17H2,1-6H3/t21-,22-,27-/m1/s1 Key: GZIFEOYASATJEH-VHFRWLAGBS
- SMILES: Oc2cc(c1O[C@](CCc1c2)(C)CCC[C@H](C)CCC[C@H](C)CCCC(C)C)C

Properties
Chemical formula	C_{27}H_{46}O_{2}
Molar mass	402.65 g/mol
- Except where otherwise noted, data are given for materials in their standard state (at 25 °C [77 °F], 100 kPa). verify (what is ?) Infobox references

δ-Tocopherol (delta-tocopherol) is a tocopherol and one of the chemical compounds that is considered vitamin E. As a food additive, it has E number E309.

== See also ==
- Alpha-Tocopherol
- Beta-Tocopherol
- Gamma-Tocopherol
