= SMCO4 =

Protein-coding gene in the species Homo sapiens

Identifiers
- Aliases: SMCO4, C11orf75, FN5, single-pass membrane protein with coiled-coil domains 4
- External IDs: OMIM: 609477; MGI: 3039636; HomoloGene: 137340; GeneCards: SMCO4; OMA:SMCO4 - orthologs

Gene location (Human)
Chr.	Chromosome 11 (human)
Band	11q21	Start	93,478,472 bp
Band	11q21	End	93,543,391 bp

Gene location (Mouse)
Chr.	Chromosome 9 (mouse)
Band	9|9 A2	Start	15,404,728 bp
Band	9|9 A2	End	15,456,556 bp
RNA expression pattern
Bgee	Human / Mouse (ortholog); Top expressed in: parotid gland; secondary oocyte; monocyte; right lobe of liver; jejunal mucosa; left lobe of thyroid gland; granulocyte; right lobe of thyroid gland; right adrenal gland; right adrenal cortex / Top expressed in: zygote; parotid gland; secondary oocyte; yolk sac; spermatid; interventricular septum; Paneth cell; submandibular gland; lip; primary oocyte; More reference expression data
BioGPS	n/a
Gene ontology
Molecular function	protein binding; molecular function
Cellular component	integral component of membrane; membrane; cellular component
Biological process	biological process
Sources:Amigo / QuickGO
Orthologs
Species	Human	Mouse
Entrez	56935	170748
Ensembl	ENSG00000166002	ENSMUSG00000058173
UniProt	Q9NRQ5	Q9JIS3
RefSeq (mRNA)	NM_020179	NM_133214; NM_001359604
RefSeq (protein)	NP_064564	NP_573477; NP_001346533
Location (UCSC)	Chr 11: 93.48 – 93.54 Mb	Chr 9: 15.4 – 15.46 Mb
PubMed search
- Wikidata
View/Edit Human	View/Edit Mouse

Single-pass membrane and coiled-coil domain-containing protein 4 is a single-pass membrane protein with a colloid-coil domain containing protein 4. In humans it is encoded by the SMCO4 gene. A single-pass transmembrane protein, means that one end of the protein will remain in the cytoplasm, while the other end is exposed to the cell exterior.

== Gene properties ==
The SMCO4 gene is located on chromosome 11, with specific chromosomal coordinates of 11q13.3-q23.3 in Homo sapiens. SMCO4 has two common aliases: C11orf75 (Chromosome 11 Open Reading Frame 75) and FN5.

== mRNA features ==
SMCO4 has 7 isoforms in Homo sapiens. The SMCO4 isoform 1 has 9 exons, while the rest of the isoforms have varying amounts of exons. These isoforms are listed in the table below, with their accession numbers for reference.

Isoform	SMCO4 isoform x1	SMCO4 isoform x2	SMCO4 isoform x3	SMCO4 isoform x4	SMCO4 isoform x5	SMCO4 isoform x6	SMCO4 isoform x6
NCBI accession #	XM_011542907.1	XM_011542908.2	XM_011542909.1	XM_011542910.2	XM_017018019.1	XM_017018020.1	XM_011542911.2

== Protein ==
Sequence length (bp)	Protein Sequence Length (aa)	Molecular Weight (kD)	Isoelectric Point
979	59	6.7	10.75

MRQLKGKPKKETSKDKKERKQAMQEARQQITTVVLPTLAVVVLLIVVFVYVATRPTITE

The protein that is encoded by SMCO4 is rich in phosphorylable amino acids and has a high pH. There are no predicted protein repeats. There is evidence that the protein is present in the outer membrane of the mitochondria. The absence of an N-terminal signal peptide shows that the protein does not have the ability to leave the organelle it is in, which correlates with the knowledge that it is a transmembrane protein.

=== Structure ===
The structure of the FN5 protein is not yet known, but the protein qualities are useful in predicting the protein's structure. There is no evidence that the protein would take on any Beta-turns; its secondary structure would be composed of only alpha-helixes. There are two separate helixes: the transmembrane helix and the alpha helix.

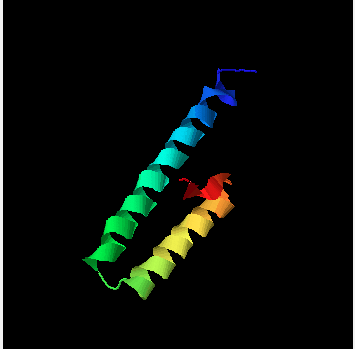
This image is an animated rendition of a possible structure that the FN5 protein would take on. The C-terminus is shown in red, and the N-terminus is shown in blue.

== Expression ==
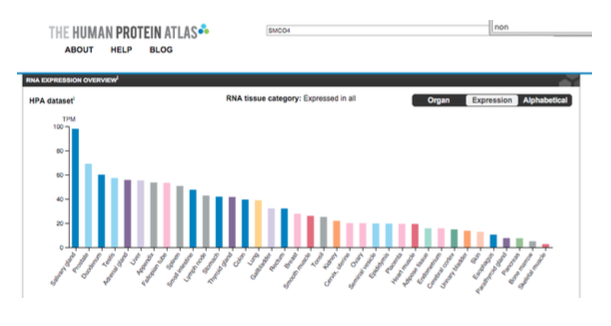
This image, from the Protein Atlas database, shows the expression levels of the SMCO4 gene in different areas throughout the body

=== Expression analysis ===
SMCO4 expression in humans was predicted to be highest in the salivary glands. Overall, there was RNA tissue expression shown in 37 human tissues and expression of the protein in 71 cell types.

=== Regulation of expression ===
SMCO4 is not ubiquitously expressed throughout humans. There is evidence that the expression of SMCO4 is easily manipulated by many different factors, making constant expression unlikely. One example of this expression regulation comes from an experiment that showed increased SMCO4 expression in the presence of Gamma-tocotrienol.

== Predicted interactions ==
SMCO4 is predicted to interact with the following proteins:

BNIP3L	BCL2/adenovirus E1B 19kDa protein-interacting protein 3-like
SYNE4	Spectrin Repeat Containing Nuclear Envelope Family Member 4
CCDC155	Coiled-Coil Domain Containing 155

== Conservation ==
Two microRNAs, miR-124-3p.1 and miR-183-5p.1, are thought to be highly conserved throughout variety of vertebrates. These microRNAs are both neuronal in nature.

=== Orthologs ===
Orthologs of SMCO4 were found in a variety of species, including mammals, birds, reptiles, amphibians, insects and parasites. The primates were consistently found to have the highest sequence identity with the human SMCO4 sequence, followed closely by an extinct fish species called Latimeria chalumnae. There was no evidence of SMCO4 presence in yeast species.
