= Γ-Tocotrienol =

γ-Tocotrienol

Names
- Preferred IUPAC name (2R)-2,7,8-Trimethyl-2-[(3E,7E)-4,8,12-trimethyltrideca-3,7,11-trien-1-yl]-3,4-dihydro-2H-1-benzopyran-6-ol

Identifiers
CAS Number	14101-61-2
3D model (JSmol)	Interactive image
ChEBI	CHEBI:33277
ChEMBL	ChEMBL120697
ChemSpider	4445514
ECHA InfoCard	100.131.059
MeSH	gamma-tocotrienol
PubChem CID	5282349
UNII	185QAE24TR
CompTox Dashboard (EPA)	DTXSID101019984
- InChI: InChI=1S/C28H42O2/c1-20(2)11-8-12-21(3)13-9-14-22(4)15-10-17-28(7)18-16-25-19-26(29)23(5)24(6)27(25)30-28/h11,13,15,19,29H,8-10,12,14,16-18H2,1-7H3/b21-13+,22-15+/t28-/m1/s1 Key: OTXNTMVVOOBZCV-WAZJVIJMSA-N
- SMILES: CC1=C(C=C2CC[C@@](OC2=C1C)(C)CC/C=C(\C)/CC/C=C(\C)/CCC=C(C)C)O

Properties
Chemical formula	C_{28}H_{42}O_{2}
Molar mass	410.63188 g/mol
- Except where otherwise noted, data are given for materials in their standard state (at 25 °C [77 °F], 100 kPa). Infobox references

γ-Tocotrienol is one of the four types of tocotrienol, a type of vitamin E.

Vitamin E exists in nature in eight forms, each of which consists of a head section joined to either a saturated (phytyl) or an unsaturated (farnesyl) tail. The four compounds with the saturated tails are the tocopherols, and the four compounds with the unsaturated tails are the tocotrienols. There are four unique dihydrocoumarin head sections, distinguished by one of four substitution patterns and designated as α, β, γ, or δ. The alpha- forms are distinguished by their three substituted methyl groups and the delta- forms by their one substituted methyl group. The beta- and gamma- forms both have two substituted methyl groups, although at different structural positions (5,8-dimethyl and 7,8-dimethyl, respectively), making both beta / gamma tocotrienol as well as the beta / gamma tocopherol pairs of stereoisomer.

== See also ==
- Vitamin E
- Tocopherol
- Tocotrienol
- Antioxidants
- α-Tocotrienol
- β-Tocotrienol
- δ-Tocotrienol
