= Aleksandr Dianin =

Russian chemist (1851–1918)

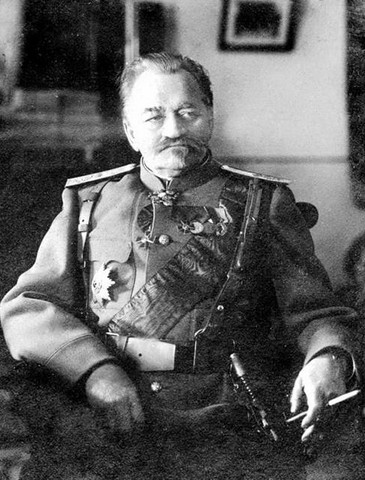
- Born: 20 April 1851; Davydovo, Vladimir Governorate, Russian Empire
- Died: 6 December 1918 (aged 67); Petrograd, RSFSR
- Education: University of Jena (PhD in Chemistry, 1877); Imperial Medical-Surgical Academy in St. Petersburg (MD, 1882)
- Known for: Bisphenol A Dianin's compound
- Scientific career
- Fields: Organic chemistry
- Workplaces: Imperial Medical-Surgical Academy in St. Petersburg

Aleksandr Pavlovich Dianin (Russian: Александр Павлович Дианин; 20 April 1851 – 6 December 1918) was a Russian chemist from Saint Petersburg. He carried out studies on phenols and discovered a phenol derivative now known as bisphenol A and the accordingly named Dianin's compound. He was married to the adopted daughter of fellow chemist Alexander Borodin. In 1887, Dianin succeeded his father-in-law as chair of the Chemistry Department at the Imperial Medical-Surgical Academy in St. Petersburg (now the S.M. Kirov Military Medical Academy).

== Bisphenol A and Dianin's compound ==
Dianin's method for preparing bisphenol A from 1891 remains the most widely-known approach to this important compound, though the method has been refined for industrial-scale synthesis. It involves the catalysed condensation of a 2:1 mixture of phenol and acetone in the presence of concentrated hydrochloric acid or sulfuric acid. The reaction proceeds readily at room temperature producing a crude product containing a great variety of side products (including Dianin's compound) in a matter of hours. The overall equation is simple, with water as the only by-product:

Mechanistically, the acid catalyst converts the acetone to a carbenium ion that undergoes an electrophilic aromatic substitution reaction with the phenol, producing predominantly para-substituted products. A second carbenium species is produced by protonation and loss of the aliphatic hydroxyl group, leading to bisphenol A (4,4'-isopropylidenediphenol) after a second aromatic substitution reaction. The process is not very selective, and a great number of minor products and side reactions are known.

Structure of Dianin's compound, a chroman side-product of Dianin's synthesis of bisphenol A.

Side products that are isomers of bisphenol A result from the formation of ortho-substituted products, and include the 2,2'- and 2,4'- isomers of isopropylidenediphenol. Other side reactions include the formation of triphenol I, 4,4'-(4-hydroxy-m-phenylenediisopropylidene)diphenol, from the attack of a carbenium electrophile on a bisphenol A molecule and the formation of triphenol II, 4,4',4''-(2-methyl-2-pentanyl-4-ylidene)triphenol, when an elimination reaction converts the carbenium to a reactive olefin. Catalysed dimerisation of acetone via an aldol condensation is well known, and yields diacetone alcohol and (by dehydration) mesityl oxide in both acidic and basic conditions. The in situ generation of mesityl oxide adds another reactive olefin to the mixture. In cases where an olefinic moiety can interact with a phenolic hydroxyl group (typically as a result of ortho-substitution), rapid cyclisation reactions producing flavans and chromans occur. This is the source of Dianin's compound in the mixture, and Dianin subsequently demonstrated that the compound can be produced in much greater yield by reacting phenol with mesityl oxide directly. Later work has shown that production of bisphenol A can be made much more selective by using a reaction mixture with a considerable excess of phenol rather than a stoichiometric 2:1 composition, greatly suppressing side reactions.
