= Tocopherol =

Antioxidant compounds with vitamin E activity

Tocopherols (/toʊˈkɒfəˌrɒl/; TCP) are a class of organic compounds comprising various methylated phenols, many of which have vitamin E activity. Because the vitamin activity was first identified in 1936 from a dietary fertility factor in rats, it was named tocopherol, from Greek τόκος tókos 'birth' and φέρειν phérein 'to bear or carry', that is 'to carry a pregnancy', with the ending -ol signifying its status as a chemical alcohol.

α-Tocopherol is the main source found in supplements and in the European diet, where the main dietary sources are olive and sunflower oils, while γ-tocopherol is the most common form in the American diet due to a higher intake of soybean and corn oil.

== Forms ==
Vitamin E exists in eight different forms, four tocopherols and four tocotrienols. All feature a chromane ring, with a hydroxyl group that can donate a hydrogen atom to reduce free radicals and a hydrophobic side chain that allows for penetration into biological membranes. Both the tocopherols and tocotrienols occur in α (alpha), β (beta), γ (gamma), and δ (delta) forms, determined by the number and position of methyl groups on the chromanol ring.

Form	Structure	5-position	7-position
α-Tocopherol		methyl	methyl
β-Tocopherol		methyl	H
γ-Tocopherol		H	methyl
δ-Tocopherol		H	H

The tocotrienols have the same methyl structure at the ring and the same Greek-letter methyl notation, but differ from the analogous tocopherols by the presence of three double bonds in the hydrophobic side chain. The unsaturation of the tails gives tocotrienols only a single stereoisomeric carbon (and thus two possible isomers per structural formula, one of which occurs naturally), whereas tocopherols have three centers (and eight possible stereoisomers per structural formula, only one of which occurs naturally).

Each form has a different biological activity. In general, the unnatural l-isomers of tocotrienols lack almost all vitamin activity, and half of the possible 8 isomers of the tocopherols (those with 2S chirality at the ring–tail junction) also lack vitamin activity. Of the stereoisomers that retain activity, increasing methylation, especially full methylation to the α-form, increases vitamin activity. In tocopherols, this is due to the higher binding energy of the α-tocopherol form of the vitamin to the tocopherol binding protein.

As a food additive, tocopherol is labeled with these E numbers: E306 (tocopherol), E307 (α-tocopherol), E308 (γ-tocopherol), and E309 (δ-tocopherol). All of these are approved in the US, EU, and Australia and New Zealand for use as antioxidants.

=== α-Tocopherol ===
α-Tocopherol is the form of vitamin E that is preferentially absorbed and accumulated in humans. It is also the most bioactive form of tocopherol. The measurement of "vitamin E" activity in international units (IU) was based on fertility enhancement by the prevention of miscarriages in pregnant rats relative to α-tocopherol.

Although the mono-methylated form ddd-γ-tocopherol is the most prevalent form of vitamin E in oils, there is evidence that rats can methylate this form to the preferred α-tocopherol, since several generations of rats retained α-tocopherol tissue levels, even when those generations were fed only γ-tocopherol through their lives.

There are three stereocenters in α-tocopherol, so this is a chiral molecule. The eight stereoisomers of α-tocopherol differ in the arrangement of groups around these stereocenters. In the image of RRR-α-tocopherol below, all three stereocenters are in the R form. However, if the middle of the three stereocenters were changed (so the hydrogen was now pointing down and the methyl group pointing up), this would become the structure of RSR-α-tocopherol. These stereoisomers also may be named in an alternative older nomenclature, where the stereocenters are either in the d or l form.

RRR stereoisomer of α-tocopherol, bonds around the stereocenters are shown as dashed lines (pointing down) or wedges (pointing up).

1 IU of tocopherol is defined as 2/3 milligrams of RRR-α-tocopherol (formerly named d-α-tocopherol or sometimes ddd-α-tocopherol). 1 IU is also defined as 1 milligram of an equal mix of the eight stereoisomers, which is a racemic mixture called all-rac-α-tocopheryl acetate. This mix of stereoisomers is often called dl-α-tocopheryl acetate, even though it is more precisely dl,dl,dl-α-tocopheryl acetate). However, 1 IU of this racemic mixture is not now considered equivalent to 1 IU of natural (RRR) α-tocopherol, and the Institute of Medicine and the USDA now convert IU's of the racemic mixture to milligrams of equivalent RRR using 1 IU racemic mixture = 0.45 "milligrams α-tocopherol".

=== Tocotrienols ===
Tocotrienols also belong to the vitamin E family. Tocotrienols have four natural 2' d-isomers (they have a stereoisomeric carbon only at the 2' ring-tail position). The four tocotrienols (in order of decreasing methylation: d-α-, d-β-, d-γ-, and d-δ-tocotrienol) have structures corresponding to the four tocopherols, except with an unsaturated bond in each of the three isoprene units that form the hydrocarbon tail, whereas tocopherols have a saturated phytyl tail (the phytyl tail of tocopherols gives the possibility for 2 more stereoisomeric sites in these molecules that tocotrienols do not have). Tocotrienols have seen less research as compared to tocopherols.

== Function and dietary recommendations ==
Tocopherols function by donating H atoms to radicals (X).

=== Mechanism of action ===
Tocopherols are radical scavengers, delivering an H atom to quench free radicals. At 323 kJ/mol, the O–H bond in tocopherols is approximately 10% weaker than in most other phenols. This weak bond allows the vitamin to donate a hydrogen atom to the peroxyl radical and other free radicals, minimizing their damaging effect. The thus generated tocopheryl radical is relatively unreactive, but reverts to tocopherol by a redox reaction with a hydrogen donor such as vitamin C. As they are fat-soluble, tocopherols are incorporated into cell membranes, which are thus protected from oxidative damage.

Tocopherols are chain-breaking antioxidants. That is, they do not slow down the initiation of lipid peroxidation chain reactions, but they interrupt it. In detail, the standard lipid peroxidation chain reaction goes like

- Initiation: RH → R* where RH stands for a lipid.
- Propagation: R* + O_{2} → ROO*, ROO* + RH → ROOH + R*.
- Termination: ROO* + ROO* → degradation products.

Tocopherols insert themselves into the propagation step:

- Interrupted propagation: ROO* + ArOH → ROOH + ArO*.

Because the phenoxyl radicals ArO* are resonance stabilized, they do not in general propagate. They simply stay around until are eventually terminated by ROO* + ArO* → degradation products.

In general, the higher the reaction rate is ROO* + ArOH → ROOH + ArO*, the better it is an antioxidant. Its reaction rate is explained by stereoelectronic effect. This theory has allowed chemists to design chemicals that are even more bioactive than the most bioactive form of tocopherol.

=== Dietary considerations ===
The U.S. Recommended Dietary Allowance (RDA) for adults is 15 mg/day. The RDA is based on the α-tocopherol form because it is the most active form as originally tested. Vitamin E supplements are absorbed best when taken with meals. The U.S. Institute of Medicine has set an upper tolerable intake level (UL) for vitamin E at 1,000 mg (1,500 IU) per day, using rodent data, specifically based on the highest level to not cause issues with blood coagulation.

The European Food Safety Authority sets UL at 300 mg (all forms, measured by molar equivalent of α-tocopherol) per day. This is derived from a human experiment testing up to 800 IU of racemic α-tocopherol acetate with no adverse events, with the conversion to 300 mg (rather than a typical 540 mg α-tocopherol equivalent) reflecting an understanding of bleeding being caused by excess vitamin E interfering with the absorption of vitamin K, which has a similar structure, instead of any regular biological activity of the vitamin. The value was last reviewed in 2024; it was noted that newer data on all-cause mortality were not clear enough to be incorporated into the UL analysis.

=== α-Tocopherol equivalents ===
For dietary purposes, vitamin E activity of vitamin E isomers is expressed as α-tocopherol equivalents (a-TEs). One a-TE is defined by the biological activity of 1 mg (natural) d-α-tocopherol by the resorption-gestation bioassay, which measures the ability to prevent fetal resorption in rats.

Specifically, female rats on a diet free of vitamin E inevitably reabsorb their fetus, despite normal ability to conceive and despite no apparent developmental abnormality of the fetus. They resume the ability to carry a pregnancy to term upon a sufficient dietary supplement. This then allows establishing equivalents. For example, if, to allow 50% of pregnancy to be carried to term, one needs to either supplement X amount of the amount of α-Tocopherol, or Y amount of γ-Tocopherol, then 1 unit of α-Tocopherol is considered equivalent to Y/X unit of γ-Tocopherol.

Using this bioassay, it is known that among tocopherols, α > β ~ γ > δ. According to listings by FAO and others β-tocopherol should be multiplied by 0.5, γ-tocopherol by 0.1, and α-tocotrienol by 0.3. The IU is converted to aTE by multiplying it with 0.67. These factors do not correlate with the antioxidant activity of vitamin E isomers, where tocotrienols show even much higher activity in vivo.

== Sources ==
The U.S. Department of Agriculture (USDA), Agricultural Research Services, maintains a food composition database. The last major revision was Release 28, September 2015. In general, food sources with the highest concentrations of vitamin E are vegetable oils, followed by nuts and seeds. Adjusting for typical portion sizes, however, for many people in the United States the most important sources of vitamin E include fortified breakfast cereals.

== Deficiency ==
Vitamin E deficiency is rare, and in almost all instances caused by an underlying disease rather than a diet low in vitamin E. Vitamin E deficiency causes neurological problems due to poor nerve conduction. These include neuromuscular problems such as spinocerebellar ataxia and myopathies. Deficiency also may cause anemia, due to oxidative damage to red blood cells.

== Commercial versions ==
Commercial vitamin E sold as food, supplement, or cosmetic ingredient may be classified into several distinct categories. By the nature of the tocopherol part, they can be divided into:

- Fully synthetic racemic vitamin E, "dl-α-tocopherol", the most inexpensive, most commonly sold supplement form.
- "Natural mixed tocopherols", which is extracted from plant oil.
- Fractionated "natural" d-α-tocopherol, which is the form of α-tocopherol found in nature. They are often made by semi-synthesis in addition to fractionation, starting from natural mixed tocopherols and undergoing a methylation procedure to convert the gamma and beta d-tocopherol vitamers into the α form. Commonly used in medicine and supplements.
  - Other fractions extracted from plant oil such as high d-γ-tocopherol fraction supplements.

They can also be divided into free tocophenol and ester (often acetate) forms.

=== Synthetic all-racemic and d-α-tocopherol ===
Synthetic vitamin E derived from petroleum products is manufactured as all-racemic α-tocopheryl acetate with a mixture of eight stereoisomers. In this mixture, one α-tocopherol molecule in eight molecules are in the form of RRR-α-tocopherol (12.5% of the total).

The 8-isomer all-rac vitamin E is always marked on labels simply as dl-tocopherol or dl-tocopheryl acetate, even though it is (if fully written out) dl,dl,dl-tocopherol. The present largest manufacturers of this type are DSM and BASF.

Natural α-tocopherol is the RRR-α (or ddd-α) form. The synthetic dl,dl,dl-α ("dl-α") form is not so active as the natural ddd-α ("d-α") tocopherol form. This is mainly due to reduced vitamin activity of the four possible stereoisomers that are represented by the l or S enantiomer at the first stereocenter (an S or l configuration between the chromanol ring and the tail, i.e., the SRR, SRS, SSR, and SSS stereoisomers). The three unnatural "2R" stereoisomers with natural R configuration at this 2' stereocenter, but S at one of the other centers in the tail (i.e., RSR, RRS, RSS), appear to retain substantial RRR vitamin activity, because they are recognized by the alpha-tocopherol transfer protein, and thus maintained in the plasma, where the other four stereoisomers (SRR, SRS, SSR, and SSS) are not. Thus, the synthetic all-rac-α-tocopherol, in theory, would have approximately half the vitamin activity of RRR-α-tocopherol in humans. Experimentally, the ratio of activities of the 8 stereoisomer racemic mixture to the natural vitamin, is 1 to 1.36 in the rat pregnancy model (suggesting a measured activity ratio of 1/1.36 = 74% of natural, for the 8-isomer racemic mix, higher than 50%).

Although it is clear that mixtures of stereoisomers are not so active as the natural RRR-α-tocopherol form, in the ratios discussed above, specific information on any side effects of the seven synthetic vitamin E stereoisomers is not readily available. On the other hand, there is enough evidence for the whole racemic mixture; in fact, both the US RDA and EFSA ULs for vitamin E are derived based on racemic data.

=== Mixed tocopherols ===
"Mixed tocopherols" in the USA contain at least 20% w/w other natural R, R,R- tocopherols, i.e. R, R,R-α-tocopherol content plus at least 25% R, R,R-β-, R, R,R-γ-, R, R,R-δ-tocopherols.

Some brands may contain 20.0% w/w or more of the other tocopherols and measurable tocotrienols. Some mixed tocopherols with higher γ-tocopherol content are marketed as "High Gamma-Tocopherol". The label should report each component in milligrams, except R, R,R-α-tocopherol may still be reported in IU. Mixed tocopherols also may be found in other nutritional supplements.

=== Esters ===
α-tocopheryl acetate, an acetate ester of α-tocopherol

Manufacturers also commonly convert the phenol form of the vitamins (with a free hydroxyl group) to esters, using acetic or succinic acid. These tocopheryl esters are more stable and are easier to use in vitamin supplements. α-Tocopheryl esters are de-esterified in the gut and then absorbed as the free tocopherol. Tocopherol succinate, tocopheryl nicotinate, tocopheryl linolate, and tocopheryl palmitate esters are also used in cosmetics and some pharmaceuticals. Each milligram of α-tocopheryl acetate can be hydrolyzed into 0.91 mg of α-tocopherol; each mg of the succinate can be hydrolyzed into 0.81 mg of α-tocopherol.

Free vitamin E acts as an antioxidant due to its exposed phenol group; this also renders it sensitive to degradation by oxygen. The ester form shields this group from oxidation, but this also prevents the ester form from directly acting as an antioxidant. Unlike free vitamin E, the ester form is not a very effective food antioxidant, as the phenol group is prevented from being oxidized by the attached ester group. On the other hand, the ester form can slowly hydrolyze into the free tocopherol form in the presence of water, releasing some antioxidant activity. The EFSA has found α-tocopherol acetate to be a safe stabilizer for plastic materials in contact with food.

Tocofersolan is a water soluble variant produced by linking the succinate ester with polyethylene glycol. It is approved in Europe as a way to supply vitamin E to people who cannot absorb fats.

== Uses ==
Observational studies that measure dietary intake and/or serum concentration, and experimental studies that ideally are randomized clinical trials (RCTs), are two means of examining the effects or lack thereof of a proposed intervention on human health. Healthcare outcomes may be expected to be in accord between reviews of observational and experimental studies. If there is a lack of agreement, then factors other than design need to be considered. In observational studies on vitamin E, an inverse correlation between dietary intake and risk of a disease, or serum concentration and risk of a disease, may be considered suggestive, but any conclusions also should rest on randomized clinical trials of sufficient size and duration to measure clinically significant results. One concern with correlations is that other nutrients and non-nutrient compounds (such as polyphenols) may be higher in the same diets that are higher in vitamin E. Another concern for the relevance of RCTs described below is that while observational studies are comparing disease risk between low and high dietary intake of naturally occurring vitamin E from food (when worldwide, the adult median dietary intake is 6.2 mg/d for d-α-tocopherol; 10.2 mg/day when all of the tocopherol and tocotrienol isomers are included), the prospective RCTs often used 400 IU/day of synthetic dl-α-tocopherol as the test product, equivalent to 268 mg of α-tocopherol equivalents.

=== Supplement popularity over time ===
In the US, the popularity for vitamin E as a dietary supplement may have peaked around 2000. The Nurses' Health Study (NHS) and the Health Professionals Follow-up Study (HPFS) tracked dietary supplement use by people over the age of 40 during years 1986–2006. For women, user prevalence was 16.1% in 1986, 46.2% in 1998, 44.3% in 2002, but had decreased to 19.8% in 2006. Similarly, for men, prevalence for same years was 18.9%, 52.0%, 49.4%, and 24.5%. The authors theorized that declining use in these health science aware populations may have been due to publications of studies that showed either no benefits or negative consequences from vitamin E supplements. There is other evidence for declining use of vitamin E. Within the U.S. military services, vitamin prescriptions written for active, reserve and retired military, and their dependents, were tracked over years 2007–2011. Vitamin E prescriptions decreased by 53% while vitamin C remained constant and vitamin D increased by 454%. A report on vitamin E sales volume in the USA documented a 50% decrease between 2000 and 2006, with a significant cause attributed to a well-publicized meta-analysis that had concluded that high-dosage vitamin E increased all-cause mortality.

=== Age-related macular degeneration ===
A Cochrane review published in 2017 (updated in 2023) on antioxidant vitamin and mineral supplements for slowing the progression of age-related macular degeneration (AMD) identified only one vitamin E clinical trial. That trial compared 500 IU/day of α-tocopherol to placebo for four years and reported no effect on the progression of AMD in people already diagnosed with the condition. Another Cochrane review, same year, same authors, reviewed the literature on α-tocopherol preventing the development of AMD. This review identified four trials, duration 4–10 years, and reported no change to risk of developing AMD. A large clinical trial known as AREDS compared β-carotene (15 mg), vitamin C (500 mg), and α-tocopherol (400 IU) to placebo for up to ten years, with a conclusion that the anti-oxidant combination significantly slowed progression. However, because there was no group in the trial receiving only vitamin E, no conclusions could be drawn as to the contribution of the vitamin to the effect.

=== Complementary and alternative medicine ===
Proponents of megavitamin therapy and orthomolecular medicine advocate natural tocopherols. Meanwhile, clinical trials have largely concentrated on use of either a synthetic, all-racemic d-α-tocopheryl acetate or synthetic dl-α-tocopheryl acetate.

==== Antioxidant theory ====
Tocopherol is described as functioning as an antioxidant. A dose-ranging trial was conducted in people with chronic oxidative stress attributed to elevated serum cholesterol. Plasma F2-isoprostane concentration was selected as a biomarker of free radical-mediated lipid peroxidation. Only the two highest doses - 1600 and 3200 IU/day - significantly lowered F2-isoprostane.

=== Alzheimer's disease ===
Alzheimer's disease (AD) and vascular dementia are common causes of decline of brain functions that occur with age. AD is a chronic neurodegenerative disease that worsens over time. The disease process is associated with plaques and tangles in the brain. Vascular dementia may be caused by ischemic or hemorrhagic infarcts affecting multiple brain areas, including the anterior cerebral artery territory, the parietal lobes, or the cingulate gyrus. Both types of dementia may be present. Vitamin E status (and that of other antioxidant nutrients) is conjectured as having a possible impact on risk of Alzheimer's disease and vascular dementia. A review of dietary intake studies reported that higher consumption of vitamin E from foods lowered the risk of developing AD by 24%. A second review examined serum vitamin E levels and reported lower serum vitamin E in AD patients compared to healthy, age-matched people. In 2017 a consensus statement from the British Association for Psychopharmacology included that until further information is available, vitamin E cannot be recommended for treatment or prevention of Alzheimer's disease.

=== Cancer ===
From reviews of observational studies, diets higher in vitamin E content were associated with a lower relative risk of kidney cancer, bladder cancer, and lung cancer When comparisons were made between the lowest and highest groups for dietary vitamin E consumption from food, the average reductions in relative risk were in the range of 16-19%. For all of these reviews, the authors noted that the findings needed to be confirmed by prospective studies. From randomized clinical trials (RCTs) in which α-tocopherol was administered as a dietary supplement, results differed from the dietary intake reviews. A RCT of 400 IU/day of α-tocopherol did not reduce risk of bladder cancer. In male tobacco smokers, 50 mg/day had no impact on developing lung cancer. A review of RCTs for colorectal cancer reported lack of a statistically significant reduction in risk. In male tobacco smokers, 50 mg/day reduced prostate cancer risk by 32%, but in a different trial, majority non-smokers, 400 IU/day increased risk by 17%. In women who consumed either placebo or 600 IU of natural-source vitamin E on alternate days for an average of 10.1 years there were no significant differences for breast cancer, lung cancer, or colon cancer.

The U.S. Food and Drug Administration initiated a process of reviewing and approving food and dietary supplement health claims in 1993. A Qualified Health Claim issued in 2012 allows product label claims that vitamin E may reduce risk of renal, bladder, and colorectal cancers, with a stipulation that the label must include a mandatory qualifier sentence: "FDA has concluded that there is very little scientific evidence for this claim." The European Food Safety Authority (EFSA) reviews proposed health claims for the European Union countries. As of March 2018, EFSA has not evaluated any vitamin E and cancer prevention claims.

=== Cataracts ===
A meta-analysis from 2015 reported that for studies that reported serum tocopherol, higher serum concentration was associated with a 23% reduction in relative risk of age-related cataracts (ARC), with the effect due to differences in nuclear cataract rather than cortical or posterior subcapsular cataract - the three major classifications of age-related cataracts. However, this article and a second meta-analysis reporting on clinical trials of α-tocopherol supplementation reported no statistically significant change to risk of ARC when compared to placebo.

=== Cardiovascular diseases ===
Research on the effects of vitamin E on cardiovascular disease has produced conflicting results. An inverse relation has been observed between coronary heart disease and the consumption of foods high in vitamin E, and also higher serum concentration of α-tocopherol. In one of the largest observational studies, almost 90,000 healthy nurses were tracked for eight years. Compared to those in the lowest fifth for reported vitamin E consumption (from food and dietary supplements), those in the highest fifth were at a 34% lower risk of major coronary disease. Diet higher in vitamin E also may be higher in other, unidentified components that promote heart health, or people choosing such diets may be making other healthy lifestyle choices. There is some supporting evidence from randomized clinical trials (RCTs). A meta-analysis on the effects of α-tocopherol supplementation in RCTs on aspects of cardiovascular health reported that when consumed without any other antioxidant nutrient, the relative risk of heart attack was reduced by 18%. The results were not consistent for all of the individual trials incorporated into the meta-analysis. For example, the Physicians' Health Study II did not show any benefit after 400 IU every other day for eight years, for heart attack, stroke, coronary mortality, or all-cause mortality. The effects of vitamin E supplementation on incidence of stroke were summarized in 2011. There were no significant benefits for vitamin E versus placebo for risk of stroke, or for subset analysis for ischaemic stroke, haemorrhagic stroke, fatal stroke, or non-fatal stroke.

In 2001 the U.S. Food and Drug Administration rejected proposed health claims for vitamin E and cardiovascular health. The U.S. National Institutes of Health also reviewed the literature and concluded there was not sufficient evidence to support the idea that routine use of vitamin E supplements prevents cardiovascular disease or reduces its morbidity and mortality. In 2010 the European Food Safety Authority reviewed and rejected claims that a cause and effect relationship has been established between the dietary intake of vitamin E and maintenance of normal cardiac function or of normal blood circulation.

=== Pregnancy ===
Antioxidant vitamins as dietary supplements have been proposed as having benefits if consumed during pregnancy. For the combination of vitamin E with vitamin C supplemented to pregnant women, a Cochrane review of 21 clinical trials concluded that the data do not support vitamin E supplementation - majority of trials α-tocopherol at 400 IU/day plus vitamin C at 1000 mg/day - as being efficacious for reducing risk of stillbirth, neonatal death, preterm birth, preeclampsia, or any other maternal or infant outcomes, either in healthy women or those considered at risk for pregnancy complications. The review identified only three small trials in which vitamin E was supplemented without co-supplementation with vitamin C. None of these trials reported any clinically meaningful information.

=== Topical ===
Although there is widespread use of vitamin E as a topical medication, with claims for improved wound healing and reduced scar tissue, reviews have repeatedly concluded that there is insufficient evidence to support these claims.

== Side effects ==
The U.S. Food and Nutrition Board set a Tolerable upper intake level (UL) at 1,000 mg (1,500 IU) per day derived from animal models that demonstrated bleeding at high doses. The European Food Safety Authority reviewed the same safety question and set a UL at 300 mg/day. A meta-analysis of long-term clinical trials reported a non-significant 2% increase in all-cause mortality when α-tocopherol was the only supplement used. Another meta-analysis reported a non-significant 1% increase in all-cause mortality when α-tocopherol was the only supplement. Subset analysis reported no difference between natural (plant extracted) or synthetic α-tocopherol, or whether the amount used was less than or more than 400 IU/day. There are reports of vitamin E-induced allergic contact dermatitis from use of vitamin-E derivatives such as tocopheryl linoleate and tocopherol acetate in skin care products. Incidence is low despite widespread use.

=== Drug interactions ===
The amounts of α-tocopherol, other tocopherols and tocotrienols that are components of dietary vitamin E, when consumed from foods, do not appear to cause any interactions with drugs. Consumption of α-tocopherol as a dietary supplement in amounts in excess of 300 mg/day may lead to interactions with aspirin, warfarin, tamoxifen, and cyclosporine A in ways that alter function. For aspirin and warfarin, high amounts of vitamin E may potentiate anti-blood clotting action. One small trial demonstrated that vitamin E at 400 mg/day reduced blood concentration of the anti-breast cancer drug tamoxifen. In multiple clinical trials, vitamin E lowered blood concentration of the immuno-suppressant drug, cyclosporine A. The U.S. National Institutes of Health, Office of Dietary Supplements, raises a concern that co-administration of vitamin E could counter the mechanisms of anti-cancer radiation therapy and some types of chemotherapy, and so advises against its use in these patient populations. The references it cited reported instances of reduced treatment adverse effects, but also poorer cancer survival, raising the possibility of tumor protection from the oxidative damage intended by the treatments.

== Synthesis ==
Naturally sourced d-α-tocopherol can be extracted and purified from seed oils, or γ-tocopherol can be extracted, purified, and methylated to create d-alpha-tocopherol. In contrast to α-tocopherol extracted from plants, which also is called d-α-tocopherol, industrial synthesis creates dl-α-tocopherol. "It is synthesized from a mixture of toluene and 2,3,5-trimethyl-hydroquinone that reacts with isophytol to all-rac-α-tocopherol, using iron in the presence of hydrogen chloride gas as a catalyst. The reaction mixture obtained is filtered and extracted with aqueous caustic soda. Toluene is removed by evaporation and the residue (all rac-α-tocopherol) is purified by vacuum distillation." Specification for the ingredient is >97% pure. This synthetic dl-α-tocopherol has approximately 50% of the potency of d-α-tocopherol. Manufacturers of dietary supplements and fortified foods for humans or domesticated animals convert the phenol form of the vitamin to an ester using either acetic acid or succinic acid because the esters are more chemically stable, providing for a longer shelf-life. The ester forms are de-esterified in the gut and absorbed as free α-tocopherol.

== History ==
During feeding experiments with rats Herbert McLean Evans concluded in 1922 that besides vitamins B and C, an unknown vitamin existed. Although every other nutrition was present, the rats were not fertile. This condition could be changed by additional feeding with wheat germ. It took several years until 1936 when the substance was isolated from wheat germ and the formula C_{29}H_{50}O_{2} was determined. Evans also found that the compound reacted like an alcohol and concluded that one of the oxygen atoms was part of an OH (hydroxyl) group. As noted in the introduction, the vitamin was given its name by Evans from Greek words meaning "to bear young" with the addition of the -ol as an alcohol. The structure was determined shortly thereafter in 1938.

== See also ==
- α-Tocopherol
- Tocotrienol
- Vitamin E
