= Chromane =

Names
- Preferred IUPAC name 3,4-Dihydro-2H-1-benzopyran
- Other names Chroman; Benzodihydropyran; Benzoxane

Identifiers
CAS Number	493-08-3
3D model (JSmol)	Interactive image
Beilstein Reference	116150
ChEBI	CHEBI:33224
ChemSpider	120093
ECHA InfoCard	100.344.744
EC Number	874-955-4
Gmelin Reference	122981
PubChem CID	136319
UNII	EJ8R7LY9PK
CompTox Dashboard (EPA)	DTXSID10197758
- InChI: InChI=1S/C9H10O/c1-2-6-9-8(4-1)5-3-7-10-9/h1-2,4,6H,3,5,7H2 Key: VZWXIQHBIQLMPN-UHFFFAOYSA-N; InChI=1/C9H10O/c1-2-6-9-8(4-1)5-3-7-10-9/h1-2,4,6H,3,5,7H2 Key: VZWXIQHBIQLMPN-UHFFFAOYAB
- SMILES: C1CC2=CC=CC=C2OC1

Properties
Chemical formula	C_{9}H_{10}O
Molar mass	134.178 g·mol^{−1}

Hazards
- GHS labelling
Pictograms	(GHS02: Flammable) (GHS07: Exclamation mark)
Signal word	Warning
Hazard statements	H226, H302, H315, H319, H335
Precautionary statements	P210, P233, P240, P241, P242, P243, P261, P264, P264+P265, P270, P271, P280, P301+P317, P302+P352, P303+P361+P353, P304+P340, P305+P351+P338, P319, P321, P330, P332+P317, P337+P317, P362+P364, P370+P378, P403+P233, P403+P235, P405, P501

Related compounds
Related compounds	Tetrahydroquinoline, Tetralin, Chromene, Coumaran
- Except where otherwise noted, data are given for materials in their standard state (at 25 °C [77 °F], 100 kPa). Infobox references

Chromane (benzodihydropyran) is a heterocyclic chemical compound with the chemical formula C_{9}H_{10}O. Chromane is a structural feature of more complex compounds including E vitamins (tocopherols and tocotrienols), Dianin's compound, and the pharmaceutical drugs troglitazone, ormeloxifene, and nebivolol. Such compounds are sometimes described as chromans.

== See also ==
- Chromene (benzopyran)
