= Dianin's compound =

Names
- IUPAC name 4-(2,2,4-Trimethyl-4-chromanyl)phenol
- Other names 4-p-Hydroxyphenyl-2,2,4-trimethylchroman

Identifiers
CAS Number	472-41-3
3D model (JSmol)	Interactive image; Interactive image
ChemSpider	88264
ECHA InfoCard	100.006.775
PubChem CID	97788
UNII	90766708Z6
CompTox Dashboard (EPA)	DTXSID30883388
- InChI: InChI=1S/C18H20O2/c1-17(2)12-18(3,13-8-10-14(19)11-9-13)15-6-4-5-7-16(15)20-17/h4-11,19H,12H2,1-3H3 Key: KXYDGGNWZUHESZ-UHFFFAOYSA-N; InChI=1/C18H20O2/c1-17(2)12-18(3,13-8-10-14(19)11-9-13)15-6-4-5-7-16(15)20-17/h4-11,19H,12H2,1-3H3 Key: KXYDGGNWZUHESZ-UHFFFAOYAP
- SMILES: CC1(CC(C2=CC=CC=C2O1)(C)C3=CC=C(C=C3)O)C; Oc1ccc(cc1)C2(c3c(OC(C2)(C)C)cccc3)C

Properties
Chemical formula	C_{18}H_{20}O_{2}
Molar mass	268.35 g/mol
- Except where otherwise noted, data are given for materials in their standard state (at 25 °C [77 °F], 100 kPa). verify (what is ?) Infobox references

Dianin's compound (4-p-hydroxyphenyl-2,2,4-trimethylchroman) was first prepared by Aleksandr Dianin in 1914. This compound is a condensation isomer of bisphenol A and acetone and of special importance in host–guest chemistry because it can form a large variety of clathrates with suitable guest molecules. One example is the clathrate of Dianin's compound with morpholine. Slow evaporation of a solution containing both organic compounds yields crystals. Each asymmetric unit cell making up the crystal contains six chroman molecules of which two are deprotonated and two protonated morpholine molecules. The six chroman molecules are racemate pairs.
