= Γ-Tocopherol =

γ-Tocopherol
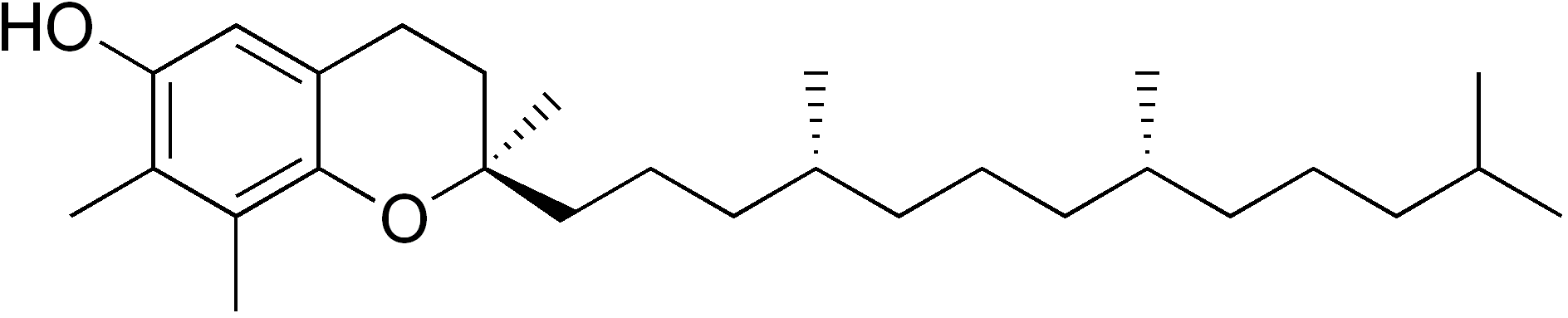

Names
- Preferred IUPAC name (2R)-2,7,8-Trimethyl-2-[(4R,8R)-4,8,12-trimethyltridecyl]-3,4-dihydro-2H-1-benzopyran-6-ol

Identifiers
CAS Number	54-28-4
3D model (JSmol)	Interactive image
Beilstein Reference	93072
ChEBI	CHEBI:18185
ChemSpider	83708
DrugBank	DB15394
ECHA InfoCard	100.000.183
EC Number	200-201-5
E number	E308 (antioxidants, ...)
KEGG	C02483
PubChem CID	92729
UNII	8EF1Z1238F
CompTox Dashboard (EPA)	DTXSID9049031
- InChI: InChI=1S/C28H48O2/c1-20(2)11-8-12-21(3)13-9-14-22(4)15-10-17-28(7)18-16-25-19-26(29)23(5)24(6)27(25)30-28/h19-22,29H,8-18H2,1-7H3/t21-,22-,28-/m1/s1 Key: QUEDXNHFTDJVIY-DQCZWYHMSA-N
- SMILES: C[C@H](CCC[C@H](C)CCCC(C)C)CCC[C@@]2(C)OC1=C(C)C(C)=C(O)C=C1CC2

Properties
Chemical formula	C_{28}H_{48}O_{2}
Molar mass	416.68 g/mol
- Except where otherwise noted, data are given for materials in their standard state (at 25 °C [77 °F], 100 kPa). verify (what is ?) Infobox references

γ-Tocopherol (gamma-tocopherol) is a tocopherol and one of the chemical compounds that comprise vitamin E. As a food additive, it has E number E308.

== See also ==
- α-Tocopherol
- β-Tocopherol
- δ-Tocopherol
