= Β-Tocotrienol =

β-Tocotrienol

Names
- Preferred IUPAC name (2R)-2,5,8-Trimethyl-2-[(3E,7E)-4,8,12-trimethyltrideca-3,7,11-trien-1-yl]-3,4-dihydro-2H-1-benzopyran-6-ol

Identifiers
CAS Number	490-23-3
3D model (JSmol)	Interactive image
ChEBI	CHEBI:33275
ChemSpider	4445513
ECHA InfoCard	100.007.008
EC Number	207-708-0
KEGG	C14154
PubChem CID	5282348
UNII	CHH810ZM8C
CompTox Dashboard (EPA)	DTXSID50883401
- InChI: InChI=1S/C28H42O2/c1-20(2)11-8-12-21(3)13-9-14-22(4)15-10-17-28(7)18-16-25-24(6)26(29)19-23(5)27(25)30-28/h11,13,15,19,29H,8-10,12,14,16-18H2,1-7H3/b21-13+,22-15+/t28-/m1/s1 Key: FGYKUFVNYVMTAM-WAZJVIJMSA-N
- SMILES: CC1=CC(=C(C2=C1OC(CC2)(C)CCC=C(C)CCC=C(C)CCC=C(C)C)C)O

Properties
Chemical formula	C_{28}H_{42}O_{2}
Molar mass	410.642 g·mol^{−1}

Hazards
NFPA 704 (fire diamond)	2 1 0
- Except where otherwise noted, data are given for materials in their standard state (at 25 °C [77 °F], 100 kPa). Infobox references

β-Tocotrienol is a tocotrienol, a member of vitamin E family.
