= Alpha-tocopherol transfer protein =

Protein found in humans

TTPA
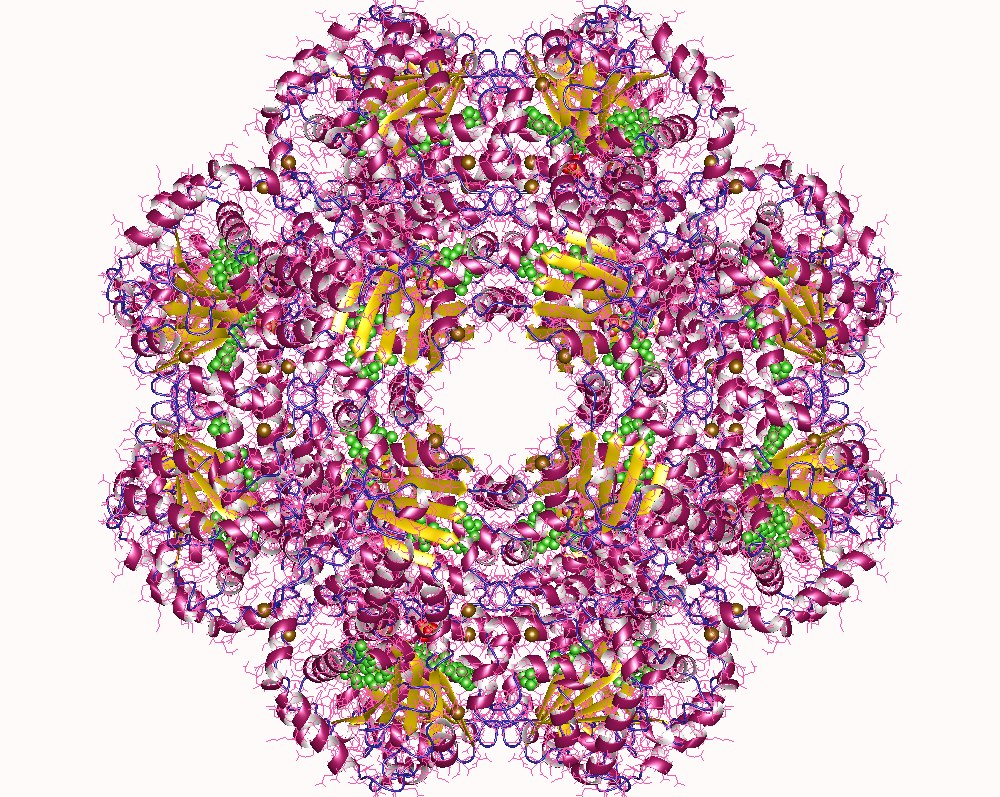

Identifiers
- Aliases: TTPA, ATTP, AVED, TTP1, alphaTTP, tocopherol (alpha) transfer protein, alpha tocopherol transfer protein
- External IDs: OMIM: 600415; MGI: 1354168; GeneCards: TTPA
Available structures
PDB	Ortholog search: PDBe RCSB
PDB	List of PDB id codes 1OIP, 1OIZ, 1R5L

Gene location (Human)
Chr.	Chromosome 8 (human)
Band	8q12.3	Start	63,048,553 bp
Band	8q12.3	End	63,086,053 bp

Gene location (Mouse)
Chr.	Chromosome 4 (mouse)
Band	4 A3|4 7.76 cM	Start	20,007,938 bp
Band	4 A3|4 7.76 cM	End	20,030,785 bp
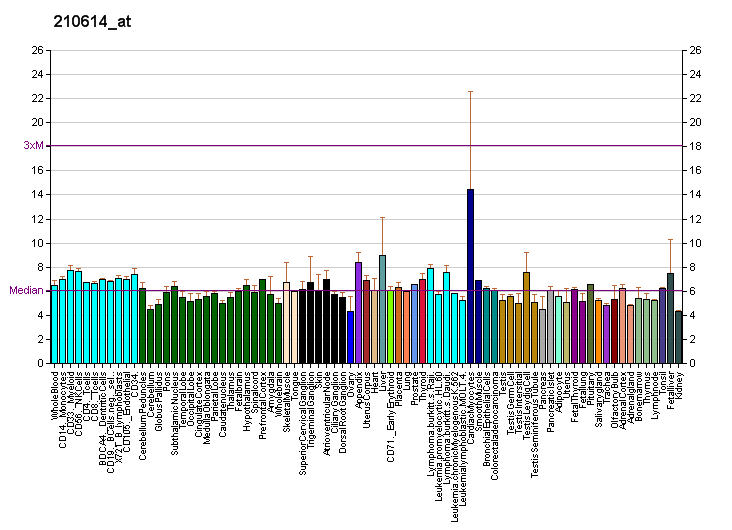
RNA expression pattern
Bgee	Human / Mouse (ortholog); Top expressed in: right lobe of liver; buccal mucosa cell; gonad; rectum; testicle; ventricular zone; nucleus accumbens; caudate nucleus; amygdala; mucosa of transverse colon / Top expressed in: left lobe of liver; parotid gland; submandibular gland; lumbar subsegment of spinal cord; right kidney; hair follicle; proximal tubule; mammary gland; sexually immature organism; human kidney; More reference expression data
BioGPS	More reference expression data
Gene ontology
Molecular function	vitamin binding; vitamin E binding; phosphatidylinositol-3,4-bisphosphate binding; protein binding; phosphatidylinositol-4,5-bisphosphate binding; lipid binding; lipid transfer activity
Cellular component	cytoplasm; late endosome; cytosol
Biological process	intracellular pH reduction; response to nutrient; placenta development; lipid metabolism; embryonic placenta development; negative regulation of cell death; negative regulation of establishment of blood-brain barrier; response to pH; vitamin transport; response to toxic substance; vitamin E metabolic process; intermembrane lipid transfer; developmental process
Sources:Amigo / QuickGO
Orthologs
Databases	NCBI: entry; OMA: entry
Species	Human	Mouse
Entrez	7274	50500
Ensembl	ENSG00000137561	ENSMUSG00000073988
UniProt	P49638	Q8BWP5
RefSeq (mRNA)	NM_000370	NM_015767; NM_001317723
RefSeq (protein)	NP_000361	NP_001304652; NP_056582
Location (UCSC)	Chr 8: 63.05 – 63.09 Mb	Chr 4: 20.01 – 20.03 Mb
PubMed search
- Wikidata
View/Edit Human	View/Edit Mouse

Alpha-tocopherol transfer protein (α-TTP) is a protein that in humans is encoded by the TTPA gene. This protein binds to alpha-tocopherol (a type of vitamin E), and is involved in transferring it between different cellular membranes, and stimulating its release from liver cells.

== Background and function ==
The most abundant forms of vitamin E found in natural sources are α-tocopherol and γ-tocopherol. These are absorbed in the small intestines, and then transported to the liver. In hepatocytes (liver cells), α-TTP preferentially binds to α-tocopherol, which are then transferred to very low-density lipoproteins (VLDLs). These VLDLs are responsible for transporting the vitamin E to other parts of the body, where it functions as an antioxidant. Types of vitamin E that do not readily bind to α-TTP, like γ-tocopherol, are instead primarily excreted by the body as part of urine or bile.

== Medical significance ==
Pathogenic mutations in TTPA are associated with a disorder called ataxia with vitamin E deficiency (AVED) (also called familial isolated vitamin E deficiency).
