= WHO Expert Committee on Biological Standardization =

WHO Expert Committee on Biological Standardization is a functioning body of World Health Organization. The Expert Committee has been meeting annually since 1947. The Committee reports are published as WHO Technical Report Series, available online.

A precursor to this organization is the Permanent Commission on Biological Standardisation of the League of Nations Health Organisation.
