= Tocotrienol =

Group of chemical compounds

General chemical structure of tocotrienols. alpha(α)-Tocotrienol: R1 = Me, R2 = Me, R3 = Me; beta(β)-Tocotrienol: R1 = Me, R2 = H, R3= Me; gamma(γ)-Tocotrienol: R1 = H, R2 = Me, R3= Me; delta(δ)-Tocotrienol: R1 = H, R2 = H, R3= Me

Tocotrienols are plant-derived natural products belonging to the vitamin E family of diterpenoids. They exist as four isomers (alpha, beta, gamma, delta), each differing in the number and position of methyl groups on their chromanol ring. Tocotrienols are distinguished from the closely related tocopherols by their side chains: tocotrienols have three unsaturated isoprenoid double bonds, whereas tocopherols have a fully saturated side chain.

Tocotrienols are compounds naturally occurring in some foods sources, the richest being palm oil, but to a lesser extent rice bran oil, barley, oats, and certain seeds, nuts and grains, and the oils derived from them.

Chemically, different analogues of vitamin E all show some activity as a chemical antioxidant, but do not all have the same vitamin E equivalence. Tocotrienols demonstrate activity depending on the type of antioxidant performance being measured. All tocotrienols have some physical antioxidant activity due to an ability to donate a hydrogen atom (a proton plus electron) from the hydroxyl group on the chromanol ring, to free radical and reactive oxygen species. However, they are all weaker in bioactivity than α-tocopherol. Historically studies of tocotrienols account for less than 1% of all research into vitamin E. Tocotrienols are generally well tolerated and without significant side effects.

== Medical applications ==
The Food and Nutrition Board of the Institute of Medicine of the United States National Academy of Sciences does not define a Recommended Dietary Allowance or Adequate Intake for tocotrienols.

=== Brain ===
A review of human studies in middle-aged and elderly stated "Evidence from prospective and case-control studies suggested that increased blood levels of tocotrienols were associated with favorable cognitive function outcomes." The review qualified this statement by noting that randomized, controlled clinical trials were needed to evaluate these observations.

=== Disease biomarkers ===
Reviews of human research linked tocotrienol treatment to improved biomarkers for inflammation and cardiovascular disease, although those did not report any information on clinically significant disease outcomes. Biomarkers for other diseases were not affected by tocotrienol supplementation.

== History ==
The discovery of tocotrienols was first reported by Pennock and Whittle in 1964, describing the isolation of tocotrienols from rubber. The biological significance of tocotrienols was clearly delineated in the early 1980s, when its ability to lower cholesterol was first reported by Asaf Qureshi and Elson in the Journal of Medicinal Chemistry. During the 1990s, the anti-cancer properties of tocopherols and tocotrienols began to be delineated. The current commercial sources of tocotrienol are rice bran oil and palm oil. Other natural tocotrienol sources include barley and oats. Tocotrienols are safe and human studies show no adverse effects with consumption of 240 mg/day for 48 months.

The discovery of vitamin E by scientists Katherine Bishop and Herbert Evans in 1922 marked the beginning of the understanding of tocotrienols. Vitamin E was named "tocopherol" (from the Greek words tokos, meaning childbirth, and phero, meaning to bring forth) due to its presumed role in aiding conception.

Subsequent research identified eight molecules in the vitamin E family, divided into tocopherols and tocotrienols: alpha, beta, delta, and gamma forms. While tocotrienols were discovered later in the 1960s, researchers initially focused on tocopherols, particularly alpha-tocopherol, believed to be the most biologically active form of vitamin E.

It was not until the late 1980s and early 1990s that tocotrienols began receiving more scientific attention. The term "tocotrienol" was introduced by Dr. Banyan to distinguish this isomer of vitamin E.

=== Etymology ===
Tocotrienols are named by analogy to tocopherols (from Greek words meaning to bear a pregnancy (see tocopherol); but with this word changed to include the chemical difference that tocotrienols are trienes, meaning that they share identical structure with the tocopherols except for the addition of the three double bonds to their side chains.

== Comparison to tocopherols ==
Tocotrienols have only a single chiral center—the 2' carbon on the chromanol ring, which is where the isoprenoid tail is attached. Unlike the tocopherols, which have additional chiral centers along their saturated tail chain, the unsaturated chain of the tocotrienols instead have double-bonds at these sites. Tocotrienols extracted from plants are always dextrorotatory stereoisomers, signified as d-tocotrienols. In theory, (levorotatory; l-tocotrienol) forms of tocotrienols could exist as well, which would have a 2S rather than 2R configuration at the molecules' single chiral center, but unlike synthetic, dl-alpha-tocopherol, the marketed tocotrienol dietary supplements are all d-tocotrienol extracts from palm or annatto oils.

Research suggests tocotrienols are better antioxidants than tocopherols. It has been proposed that the unsaturated side-chain in tocotrienols causes them to penetrate tissues with saturated fatty layers more efficiently than tocopherol. Lipid ORAC values are highest for δ-tocotrienol. However, that study also says: "Regarding α-tocopherol equivalent antioxidant capacity, no significant differences in the antioxidant activity of all vitamin E isoforms were found."

== Metabolism and bioavailability ==
=== Absorption and distribution ===
As dietary supplements, tocotrienols are primarily administered orally and, due to their lipophilic nature, their absorption is significantly enhanced when taken with a fat-rich diet. These compounds are mainly absorbed in the small intestine, with absorption depending on adequate pancreatic function, bile secretion, and micelle formation in the intestines. Upon administration, tocotrienols are distributed throughout the body, with higher concentrations observed in plasma and adipose tissues.

=== Bioavailability factors ===
The short half-lives of tocotrienols are attributed to their low binding affinity for α-TTP, which maintains plasma levels of tocopherols. Specifically, α-tocopherol has a significantly higher binding affinity for α-TTP compared to tocotrienols. Relative to α-tocopherol's affinity, α-tocotrienol has about 9%, δ-tocotrienol 12%, and γ-tocotrienol 2% affinity for α-TTP. Consequently, δ-tocotrienol remains in plasma for a longer duration, offering greater bioavailability and slower biotransformation compared to other isomers. Human studies have indicated that δ-tocotrienol has a bioavailability of 28%, while γ- and α-isomers exhibit 9%.

=== Metabolism and excretion ===
Tocotrienols are primarily metabolized in the liver, undergoing ω-hydroxylation by the enzymes CYP3A4 and CYP4F2, followed by β-oxidation. The final metabolites, carboxyethyl-hydroxychromanols (CEHC) and carboxymethylbutyl hydroxychroman (CMBHC), are readily excreted in urine.

== Sources ==
In nature, tocotrienols are present in many fruits and vegetables. The oil palm fruit (Elaeis guineensis) is particularly high in tocotrienols, primarily gamma-tocotrienol, alpha-tocotrienol and delta-tocotrienol. Other cultivated plants high in tocotrienols includes rice, wheat, barley, rye and oat.
