= Α-Tocopherol =

(2R)-α-Tocopherol

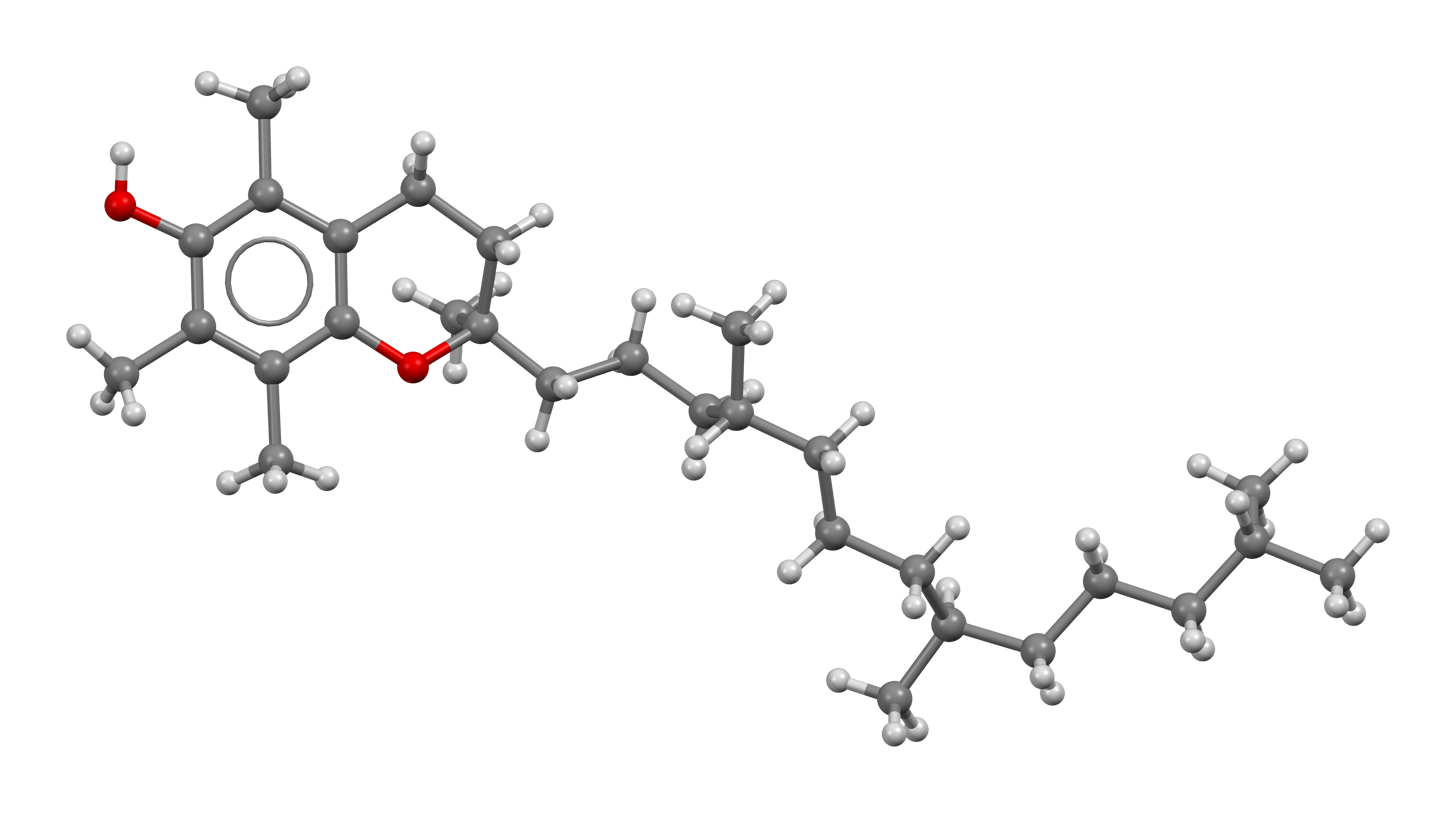

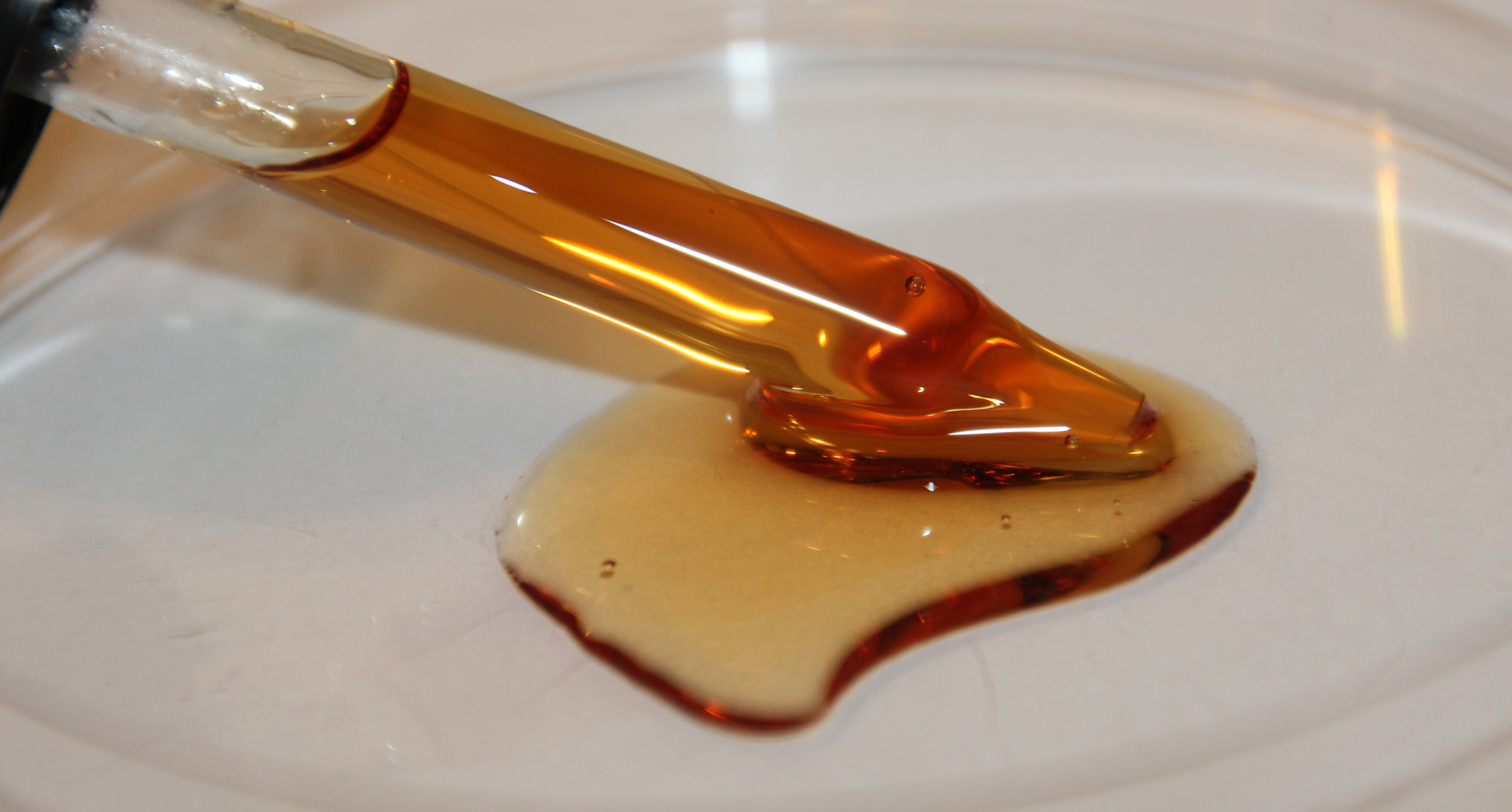

Names
- Preferred IUPAC name (2R)-2,5,7,8-Tetramethyl-2-[(4R,8R)-4,8,12-trimethyltridecyl]-3,4-dihydro-2H-1-benzopyran-6-ol

Identifiers
CAS Number	59-02-9
3D model (JSmol)	Interactive image
ChEBI	CHEBI:18145
ChEMBL	ChEMBL47
ChemSpider	14265
DrugBank	DB00163
ECHA InfoCard	100.000.375
EC Number	200-412-2
E number	E307a (antioxidants, ...)
PubChem CID	14985
UNII	N9PR3490H9
CompTox Dashboard (EPA)	DTXSID0026339
- InChI: InChI=1S/C29H50O2/c1-20(2)12-9-13-21(3)14-10-15-22(4)16-11-18-29(8)19-17-26-25(7)27(30)23(5)24(6)28(26)31-29/h20-22,30H,9-19H2,1-8H3/t21-,22-,29-/m1/s1 Key: GVJHHUAWPYXKBD-IEOSBIPESA-N; InChI=1/C29H50O2/c1-20(2)12-9-13-21(3)14-10-15-22(4)16-11-18-29(8)19-17-26-25(7)27(30)23(5)24(6)28(26)31-29/h20-22,30H,9-19H2,1-8H3/t21-,22-,29-/m1/s1 Key: GVJHHUAWPYXKBD-IEOSBIPEBS
- SMILES: Cc1c(O)c(C)c(CC[C@](CCC[C@@H](CCC[C@@H](CCCC(C)C)C)C)(C)O2)c2c1C

Properties
Chemical formula	C_{29}H_{50}O_{2}
Molar mass	430.71 g/mol
Appearance	yellow-brown viscous liquid
Density	0.950 g/cm^{3}
Melting point	2.5 to 3.5 °C (36.5 to 38.3 °F; 275.6 to 276.6 K)
Boiling point	200 to 220 °C (392 to 428 °F; 473 to 493 K) at 0.1 mmHg
Solubility in water	insoluble
Solubility	soluble in alcohol, ether, acetone, oils

Pharmacology
ATC code	A11HA03 (WHO)

Hazards
NFPA 704 (fire diamond)	1 1 0
- Except where otherwise noted, data are given for materials in their standard state (at 25 °C [77 °F], 100 kPa). verify (what is ?) Infobox references

α-Tocopherol (alpha-tocopherol) is a type of vitamin E.

It is found most in the membrane's non-raft domains, associated with omega-3 and 6 fatty acids, to partially prevent oxidation. The most prevalent form, α-tocopherol, is involved in molecular, cellular, biochemical processes closely related to overall lipoprotein and lipid homeostasis. Compared to the others, α-tocopherol is preferentially absorbed and accumulated in humans.

Vitamin E exists in 8 different forms: 4 tocopherols and 4 tocotrienols. Each form has a chromane ring, and an alkyl side chain, which is hydrophobic. The chromane ring contains a hydroxyl group that can donate a hydrogen atom to free radicals. This reaction helps reduce oxidative damage. In this way, a vitamin E acts as an antioxidant. The hydrophobic side chain helps vitamin E enter biological membranes. In the membrane, the aromatic ring of the chromane (the chromanol ring) lies near the carbonyl groups of the fatty chains of phospholipids. This allows vitamin E to concentrate from the surrounding aqueous solution into biological membranes.

Because vitamin E is lipid-soluble, it is found in many tissues. The body absorbs and distributes vitamin E through several pathways. Malaria parasites may use α-tocopherol to protect themselves from the highly oxidative environment in erythrocytes. In cardiovascular disease, α-tocopherol acts as an antioxidant. It can help prevent oxidation of low-density lipoprotein (LDL). Lower levels of oxidation of LDL may reduce atherosclerosis and arterial plaque formation.

== Synthesis ==
To synthesize the ⍺-diastereomer selectively, tocol acetate is transformed to the naturally occurring, kinetically favored α-tocopherol after being catalyzed by the lipase enzyme. This reaction occurs under biological conditions, commonly in the digestive system.

== Stereoisomers ==
α-Tocopherol has three stereocenters, so it is a chiral molecule. The eight stereoisomers of α-tocopherol differ in the configuration of these stereocenters.

- RRR-α-tocopherol is the natural one. The older name of RRR-α-tocopherol is d-α-tocopherol, but this d/l naming should no longer be used, because whether l-α-tocopherol should mean SSS enantiomer or the SRR diastereomer is not clear, from historical reasons.
- The SRR may be named 2-epi-α-tocopherol.
- The diastereomeric mixture of RRR-α-tocopherol and SRR-α-tocopherol may be called 2-ambo-α-tocopherol. This mixture can be semisynthetically produced from phytol.
- The mixture of all eight diastereomers is called all-rac-α-tocopherol. This is a commonly chemically synthesized form.

The name dl-α-tocopherol formerly referred to the 2-ambo mixture. When the optical activity of phytol was recognized, the "dl" designation became more associated with the all-rac form. In any case the "dl" designation is vague and should be avoided. The acetate ester of the 2-ambo form, 2-ambo-α-tocopheryl acetate, was the 1941 international standard for vitamin E activity.

=== Biological equivalents ===
The different stersoisomers of α-tocopherol have different degrees of bioactivity when ingested orally. This is due to them having different bioavailabilities, in turn due to their different abilities to bind to the alpha-tocopherol transfer protein (α-TTP) made by the liver. A form that binds α-TTP better is not only more protected from excretion into bile, but also more abundantly transported in blood serum to target tissues. When given as the acetate ester, RRR is the most active stersoisomer (100%), followed by RRS (90%), RSS (73%), SSS (60%), RSR (57%), SRS (37%), SRR (31%), and SSR (21%).

The international unit system defines, for nutritional purposes, one IU of vitamin E as either2/3 milligram of RRR-α-tocopherol (d-α-tocopherol) or 0.9 mg of an equal mix of the eight stereoisomers, which is a racemic mixture, all-rac-α-tocopherol. This 0.9 mg is in turn equivalent to 1 mg of all-rac-α-tocopheryl acetate, an ester also known as dl-α-tocopheryl acetate.

Starting with May 2016, the National Institutes of Health has switched to a new system of equivalents called "mg as α-tocopherol". In this new system 1 mg of "Vitamin E" is 1 mg of d-alpha-tocopherol or 2 mg of dl-alpha-tocopherol.
