= Vitamin E =

Class of 8 chemically related vitamins

- Drug class
- The RRR alpha-tocopherol form of vitamin E

Class identifiers
- Use: Vitamin E deficiency, antioxidant
- ATC code: A11HA03
- Biological target: Reactive oxygen species

Clinical data
- Drugs.com: MedFacts Natural Products

External links
- MeSH: D014810

Legal status

Vitamin E is a group of eight compounds related in molecular structure that includes four tocopherols and four tocotrienols. These compounds function as fat-soluble antioxidants which play a role in protecting cell membranes from reactive oxygen species.

Vitamin E is classified as an essential nutrient for humans. Various government organizations recommend that adults consume between 3 and 15 mg per day, while a 2016 worldwide review reported a median dietary intake of 6.2 mg per day. Sources rich in vitamin E include seeds, nuts, seed oils, peanut butter, vitamin E–fortified foods, and dietary supplements. Symptomatic vitamin E deficiency is rare, usually caused by an underlying problem with digesting dietary fat rather than from a diet low in vitamin E. Deficiency can cause neurological disorders.

Tocopherols and tocotrienols both occur in α (alpha), β (beta), γ (gamma), and δ (delta) forms, as determined by the number and position of methyl groups on the chromanol ring. All eight of these vitamers feature a chromane double ring, with a hydroxyl group that can donate a hydrogen atom to reduce free radicals, and a hydrophobic side chain that allows for penetration into biological membranes. Both natural and synthetic tocopherols are subject to oxidation, so dietary supplements are esterified, creating tocopheryl acetate, (or other forms such as succinate or palmitate) for stability purposes.

Population studies have suggested that people who consumed foods with more vitamin E, or who chose on their own to consume a vitamin E dietary supplement, had lower incidence of cardiovascular diseases, cancer, dementia, and other diseases. However, placebo-controlled clinical trials using alpha-tocopherol as a supplement, with daily amounts as high as 2,000 mg per day, could not always replicate these findings. In the United States, vitamin E supplement use peaked around 2002, but had declined by over 50% by 2006. Declining use was theorized to be due to publications of meta-analyses that showed either no benefits or actual negative consequences from high-dose vitamin E.

Vitamin E was discovered in 1922, isolated in 1935, and first synthesized in 1938. Because the vitamin activity was first identified as essential for fertilized eggs to result in live births (in rats), it was given the name "tocopherol" from Greek words meaning birth and to bear or carry. Alpha-tocopherol, either naturally extracted from plant oils or, most commonly, as tocopheryl acetate, is sold as a popular dietary supplement, either by itself or incorporated into a multivitamin product, and in oils or lotions for use on skin.

== Chemistry ==
General chemical structure of tocopherols

RRR alpha-tocopherol; chiral points are where the three dashed lines connect to the side chain

The molecules that contribute vitamin E activity are four tocopherols and four tocotrienols, within each group of four identified by the prefixes alpha- (α-), beta- (β-), gamma- (γ-), and delta- (δ-). For alpha(α)-tocopherol each of the three "R" sites has a methyl group (CH_{3}) attached. For beta(β)-tocopherol: R1 = methyl group, R2 = H, R3 = methyl group. For gamma(γ)-tocopherol: R1 = H, R2 = methyl group, R3 = methyl group. For delta(δ)-tocopherol: R1 = H, R2 = H, R3 = methyl group. The same configurations exist for the tocotrienols, except that the unsaturated side chain has three carbon-carbon double bonds whereas the tocopherols have a saturated side chain. (Esters such as alpha-tocopherol acetate are digested in the human body to yield the corresponding tocopherol.)

Nutritional labeling only takes into account the α-tocopherol form because the human liver preferentially retains this form due to the structure of alpha-tocopherol transfer protein. This form is present in much higher amounts in blood plasma than other forms, and it is known to cover the dietary requirement of vitamin E. The other forms are not considered essential.

Form	Structure
alpha-Tocopherol	
beta-Tocopherol	
gamma-Tocopherol	
delta-Tocopherol	

=== Tocopherols ===
Alpha-tocopherol is a fat-soluble antioxidant functioning within the glutathione peroxidase pathway, and protecting cell membranes from oxidation by reacting with lipid radicals produced in the lipid peroxidation chain reaction. This removes the free radical intermediates and prevents the oxidation reaction from continuing. The oxidized α-tocopheroxyl radicals produced in this process may be recycled back to the active reduced form through reduction by other antioxidants, such as ascorbate, retinol or ubiquinol.

Other forms of vitamin E have their own unique properties; for example, γ-tocopherol is a nucleophile that can react with electrophilic mutagens. It is also more easily deactivated by CYP4F2 hydroxylation.

=== Tocotrienols ===
The four tocotrienols (alpha, beta, gamma, delta) are similar in structure to the four tocopherols, with the main difference being that the former have hydrophobic side chains with three carbon-carbon double bonds, whereas the tocopherols have saturated side chains. For alpha(α)-tocotrienol each of the three "R" sites has a methyl group (CH_{3}) attached. For beta(β)-tocotrienol: R1 = methyl group, R2 = H, R3 = methyl group. For gamma(γ)-tocotrienol: R1 = H, R2 = methyl group, R3 = methyl group. For delta(δ)-tocotrienol: R1 = H, R2 = H, R3 = methyl group. Tocotrienols have only a single chiral center, which exists at the 2' chromanol ring carbon, at the point where the isoprenoid tail joins the ring. The other two corresponding centers in the phytyl tail of the corresponding tocopherols do not exist as chiral centers for tocotrienols due to unsaturation (C-C double bonds) at these sites. Tocotrienols extracted from plants are always dextrorotatory stereoisomers, signified as d-tocotrienols. In theory, levorotatory forms of tocotrienols (l-tocotrienols) could exist as well, which would have a 2S rather than 2R configuration at the molecules' single chiral center, but unlike synthetic dl-alpha-tocopherol, the marketed tocotrienol dietary supplements are extracted from palm oil or rice bran oil.

Tocotrienols are not essential nutrients; government organizations have not specified an estimated average requirement or recommended dietary allowance. A number of health benefits of tocotrienols have been proposed, including decreased risk of age-associated cognitive impairment, heart disease and cancer. Reviews of human research linked tocotrienol treatment to improved biomarkers for inflammation and cardiovascular disease, although those reviews did not report any information on clinically significant disease outcomes. Biomarkers for other diseases were not affected by tocotrienol supplementation.

=== Stereoisomers ===
In addition to distinguishing tocopherols and tocotrienols by position of methyl groups, the tocopherols have a phytyl tail with three chiral points or centers that can have a right or left orientation. The naturally occurring plant form of alpha-tocopherol is RRR-α-tocopherol, also referred to as d-tocopherol, whereas the synthetic form (all-racemic or all-rac vitamin E, also dl-tocopherol) is equal parts of eight stereoisomers RRR, RRS, RSS, SSS, RSR, SRS, SRR and SSR with progressively decreasing biological equivalency, so that 1.36 mg of dl-tocopherol is considered equivalent to 1.0 mg of d-tocopherol, the natural form. Rephrased, the synthetic has 73.5% of the potency of the natural.

== Functions ==
Tocopherols function by donating H atoms to radicals (X).

Vitamin E may have various roles as a vitamin. Many biological functions have been postulated, including a role as a lipid-soluble antioxidant. In this role, vitamin E acts as a radical scavenger, delivering a hydrogen (H) atom to free radicals. At 323 kJ/mol, the O-H bond in tocopherols is about 10% weaker than in most other phenols. This weak bond allows the vitamin to donate a hydrogen atom to the peroxyl radical and other free radicals, minimizing their damaging effect. The thus-generated tocopheryl radical is recycled to tocopherol by a redox reaction with a hydrogen donor, such as vitamin C.

Vitamin E affects gene expression and is an enzyme activity regulator, such as for protein kinase C (PKC) – which plays a role in smooth muscle growth – with vitamin E participating in deactivation of PKC to inhibit smooth muscle growth.

== Synthesis ==
=== Biosynthesis ===
Synthesis of tocopheryl acetate

Photosynthesizing plants, algae, and cyanobacteria synthesize tocochromanols, the chemical family of compounds made up of four tocopherols and four tocotrienols; in a nutrition context this family is referred to as Vitamin E. Biosynthesis starts with formation of the closed-ring part of the molecule as homogentisic acid (HGA). The side chain is attached (saturated for tocopherols, polyunsaturated for tocotrienols). The pathway for both is the same, so that gamma- is created and from that alpha-, or delta- is created and from that the beta- compounds. Biosynthesis takes place in the plastids.

The main reason plants synthesize tocochromanols appears to be for antioxidant activity. Different parts of plants, and different species, are dominated by different tocochromanols. The predominant form in leaves, and hence leafy green vegetables, is α-tocopherol. Located in chloroplast membranes in close proximity to the photosynthetic process, they protect against damage from the ultraviolet radiation of sunlight. Under normal growing conditions, the presence of α-tocopherol does not appear to be essential, as there are other photo-protective compounds; plants that, through mutations, have lost the ability to synthesize α-tocopherol demonstrate normal growth. However, under stressed growing conditions such as drought, elevated temperature, or salt-induced oxidative stress, the plants' physiological status is superior if it has the normal synthesis capacity.

Seeds are lipid-rich to provide energy for germination and early growth. Tocochromanols protect the seed lipids from oxidizing and becoming rancid. The presence of tocochromanols extends seed longevity and promotes successful germination and seedling growth. Gamma-tocopherol dominates in seeds of most plant species, but there are exceptions. For canola, corn and soy bean oils, there is more γ-tocopherol than α-tocopherol, but for safflower, sunflower and olive oils the reverse is true. Of the commonly used food oils, palm oil is unique in that tocotrienol content is higher than tocopherol content. Seed tocochromanols content is also dependent on environmental stressors. In almonds, for example, drought or elevated temperature increase α-tocopherol and γ-tocopherol content of the nuts. Drought increases the tocopherol content of olives, and heat likewise for soybeans.

Vitamin E biosynthesis occurs in the plastid and goes through two different pathways: the Shikimate pathway and the Methylerythritol Phosphate pathway (MEP pathway). The Shikimate pathway generates the chromanol ring from the Homogentisic Acid (HGA), and the MEP pathway produces the hydrophobic tail which differs between tocopherol and tocotrienol. The synthesis of the specific tail is dependent on which molecule it originates from. In a tocopherol, its prenyl tail emerges from the geranylgeranyl diphosphate (GGDP) group, while the phytyl tail of a tocotrienol stems from a phytyl diphosphate.

=== Industrial synthesis ===
The synthetic product is all-rac-alpha-tocopherol, also referred to as dl-alpha tocopherol. It consists of eight stereoisomers (RRR, RRS, RSS, RSR, SRR, SSR, SRS and SSS) in equal quantities. "It is synthesized from a mixture of toluene and 2,3,5-trimethyl-hydroquinone that reacts with isophytol to all-rac-alpha-tocopherol, using iron in the presence of hydrogen chloride gas as catalyst. The reaction mixture obtained is filtered and extracted with aqueous caustic soda. Toluene is removed by evaporation and the residue (all rac-alpha-tocopherol) is purified by vacuum distillation." The natural alpha tocopherol extracted from plants is RRR-alpha tocopherol, referred to as d-alpha-tocopherol. The synthetic has 73.5% of the potency of the natural. Manufacturers of dietary supplements and fortified foods for humans or domesticated animals convert the phenol form of the vitamin to an ester using either acetic acid or succinic acid because the esters are more chemically stable, providing for a longer shelf-life.

== Deficiency ==
A worldwide summary of more than one hundred human studies reported a median of 22.1 μmol/L for serum α-tocopherol and defined α-tocopherol deficiency as less than 12 μmol/L. It cited a recommendation that serum α-tocopherol concentration be ≥30 μmol/L to optimize health benefits. In contrast, the U.S. Dietary Reference Intake text for vitamin E concluded that a plasma concentration of 12 μmol/L was sufficient to achieve normal ex vivo hydrogen peroxide-induced hemolysis. A 2014 review defined less than 9 μmol/L as deficient, 9-12 μmol/L as marginal, and greater than 12 μmol/L as adequate.

Regardless of which definition is used, vitamin E deficiency is rare in humans, occurring as a consequence of abnormalities in dietary fat absorption or metabolism rather than from a diet low in vitamin E. Cystic fibrosis and other fat malabsorption conditions can result in low serum vitamin E. One example of a genetic abnormality in metabolism is mutations of genes coding for alpha-tocopherol transfer protein (α-TTP). Humans with this genetic defect exhibit a progressive neurodegenerative disorder known as ataxia with vitamin E deficiency (AVED) despite consuming normal amounts of vitamin E. Large amounts of alpha-tocopherol as a dietary supplement are needed to compensate for the lack of α-TTP.

Bariatric surgery as a treatment for obesity can lead to vitamin deficiencies. Long-term follow-up reported a 16.5% prevalence of vitamin E deficiency. There are guidelines for multivitamin supplementation, but adherence rates are reported to be less than 20%.

Vitamin E deficiency due to either malabsorption or metabolic anomaly can cause nerve problems due to poor conduction of electrical impulses along nerves due to changes in nerve membrane structure and function. In addition to ataxia, vitamin E deficiency can cause peripheral neuropathy, myopathies, retinopathy, and impairment of immune responses.

== Drug interactions ==
The amounts of alpha-tocopherol, other tocopherols, and tocotrienols that are components of dietary vitamin E, when consumed from foods, do not appear to cause any interactions with drugs. Consumption of alpha-tocopherol as a dietary supplement in amounts in excess of 300 mg/day may lead to interactions with aspirin, warfarin, tamoxifen and cyclosporine A in ways that alter function. For aspirin and warfarin, high amounts of vitamin E may potentiate anti-blood clotting action. In multiple clinical trials, vitamin E lowered blood concentration of the immunosuppressant medication cyclosporine A. The US National Institutes of Health, Office of Dietary Supplements, raises a concern that co-administration of vitamin E could counter the mechanisms of anti-cancer radiation therapy and some types of chemotherapy, and so advises against its use in these patient populations. The references it cites report instances of reduced treatment adverse effects, but also poorer cancer survival, raising the possibility of tumor protection from the intended oxidative damage by the treatments.

== Dietary recommendations ==
US vitamin E recommendations (mg per day)
AI (children ages 0–6 months)	4
AI (children ages 7–12 months)	5
RDA (children ages 1–3 years)	6
RDA (children ages 4–8 years)	7
RDA (children ages 9–13 years)	11
RDA (children ages 14–18 years)	15
RDA (adults ages 19+)	15
RDA (pregnancy)	15
RDA (lactation)	19
UL (adults)	1,000

The U.S. National Academy of Medicine updated estimated average requirements (EARs) and recommended dietary allowances (RDAs) for vitamin E in 2000. RDAs are higher than EARs so as to identify amounts that will cover people with higher than average requirements. Adequate intakes (AIs) are identified when there is not sufficient information to set EARs and RDAs. The EAR for vitamin E for women and men ages 14 and up is 12 mg/day. The RDA is 15 mg/day. As for safety, tolerable upper intake levels ("upper limits" or ULs) are set for vitamins and minerals when evidence is sufficient. Hemorrhagic effects in rats were selected as the critical endpoint to calculate the upper limit via starting with the lowest-observed-adverse-effect-level. The result was a human upper limit set at 1000 mg/day. Collectively the EARs, RDAs, AIs and ULs are referred to as Dietary Reference Intakes.

The European Food Safety Authority (EFSA) refers to the collective set of information as dietary reference values, with population reference intakes (PRIs) instead of RDAs, and average requirements instead of EARs. AIs and ULs are defined the same as in the United States. For women and men ages 10 and older, the PRIs are set at 11 and 13 mg/day, respectively. PRI for pregnancy is 11 mg/day, for lactation 11 mg/day. For children ages 1–9 years the PRIs increase with age from 6 to 9 mg/day. The EFSA used an effect on blood clotting as a safety-critical effect. It identified that no adverse effects were observed in a human trial as 540 mg/day, used an uncertainty factor of 2 to derive an upper limit of half of that, then rounded to 300 mg/day.

The People's Republic of China publishes dietary guidelines without specifics for individual vitamins or minerals. The United Kingdom recommends 4 mg/day for adult men and 3 mg/day for adult women. The Japan National Institute of Health and Nutrition set adult AIs at 6.5 mg/day (females) and 7.0 mg/day (males), and 650–700 mg/day (females), and 750–900 mg/day (males) for upper limits (amounts depending on age). India recommends an adult intake of 7.5–10 mg/day and does not set an upper limit. The World Health Organization recommends that adults consume 10 mg/day.

Consumption tends to be below these recommendations. A worldwide summary reported a median dietary intake of 6.2 mg/d for alpha-tocopherol.

=== Food labeling ===
For US food and dietary supplement labeling purposes, the amount in a serving is expressed as a percent of daily value. For vitamin E labeling purposes 100% of the daily value was 30 international units (IUs), but as of May 2016, it was revised to 15 mg "as alpha-tocopherol" to bring it into agreement with the RDA. A table of the old and new adult daily values is provided at Reference Daily Intake.

European Union regulations require that labels declare energy, protein, fat, saturated fat, carbohydrates, sugars, and salt. Voluntary nutrients may be shown if present in significant amounts. Instead of daily values, amounts are shown as percent of reference intakes (RIs). For vitamin E, 100% RI was set at 12 mg in 2011.

==== Units ====
Due to the variety of natural and synthetic compounds with vitamin E activity, there has historically been many different units that attempt to produce a measure of "vitamin E activity" using a weighted sum.

The international unit measurement was used by the United States in 1968–2016. 1 IU is the biological equivalent of about 0.667 mg d (RRR)-alpha-tocopherol (2/3 mg exactly), or of 0.90 mg of dl-alpha-tocopherol (or of 1.0 mg of dl-alpha-tocopherol acetate), corresponding to the then-measured relative potency of stereoisomers. In May 2016, the measurements were revised, such that 1 mg "as alpha-tocopherol" of Vitamin E is 1 mg of d-alpha-tocopherol or 2 mg of dl-alpha-tocopherol. The change was originally started in 2000, when forms of vitamin E other than alpha-tocopherol were dropped from dietary calculations by the IOM. The UL amount disregards any conversion.

The EFSA has never used an IU unit, and their measurement only considers RRR-alpha-tocopherol.

== Sources ==
Of the different forms of vitamin E, gamma-tocopherol (γ-tocopherol) is the most common form found in the North American diet, but alpha-tocopherol (α-tocopherol) is the most biologically active.

The U.S. Department of Agriculture (USDA), Agricultural Research Service, maintains a food composition database called FoodData Central. Common naturally occurring vitamin E sources are shown in the table, as are some alpha-tocopherol fortified sources such as ready-to-eat cereals, infant formulas, and liquid nutrition products.

Plant source	Amount (mg / 100 g)	
Wheat germ oil	150	
Hazelnut oil	47	
Sunflower oil	41	.1
Almond oil	39	.2
Safflower oil	34	.1
Grapeseed oil	28	.8
Sunflower seed kernels	26	.1
Almonds	25	.6
Canola/rapeseed oil	17	

Plant source	Amount (mg / 100 g)	
Palm oil	15	.9
Peanut oil	15	.7
Margarine, tub	15	.4
Hazelnuts	15	.3
Corn oil	14	.8
Olive oil	14	.3
Soybean oil	12	.1
Pine nuts	9	.3
Peanut butter	9	

Plant source	Amount (mg / 100 g)	
Pistachio nuts	2	.8
Avocados	2	.6
Spinach, raw	2	
Asparagus	1	.5
Broccoli	1	.4
Cashew nuts	0	.9
Bread	0.2–0.3	
Rice, brown	0	.2
Potato, Pasta	< 0	.1

Animal source	Amount (mg / 100 g)	
Fish	1.0–2.8	
Oysters	1	.7
Butter	1	.6
Eggs	1	.1
Cheese	0.6–0.7	
Chicken	0	.3
Beef, Pork	0	.1
Milk, whole	0	.1
Milk, skim	0	.01

Tocotrienols occur in some food sources, the richest being palm oil, and to a lesser extent rice bran oil, barley, oats, and certain seeds, nuts and grains, and the oils derived from them.

=== Supplements ===
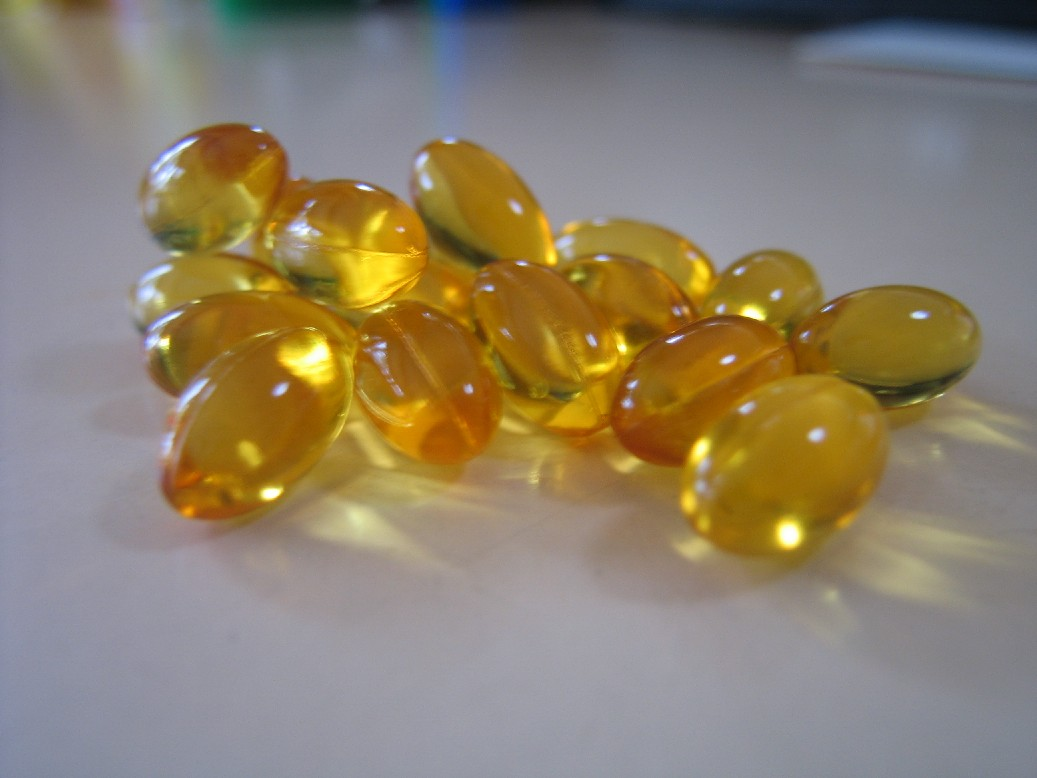
Softgel capsules used for large amounts of vitamin E

Vitamin E is fat soluble, so dietary supplement products are usually in the form of the vitamin, esterified with acetic acid to generate tocopheryl acetate, and dissolved in vegetable oil in a softgel capsule. For alpha-tocopherol, amounts range from 100 to 1000 IU per serving. Smaller amounts are incorporated into multi-vitamin/mineral tablets. Gamma-tocopherol and tocotrienol supplements are also available from dietary supplement companies. The latter are extracts from palm oil.

=== Fortification ===
The World Health Organization does not have any recommendations for food fortification with vitamin E. The Food Fortification Initiative does not list any countries that have mandatory or voluntary programs for vitamin E. Infant formulas have alpha-tocopherol as an ingredient. In some countries, certain brands of ready-to-eat cereals, liquid nutrition products, and other foods have alpha-tocopherol as an added ingredient.

=== Non-nutrient food additives ===
Various forms of vitamin E are common food additives in oily food, used to deter rancidity caused by peroxidation. Those with an E number include:

1. E306 Tocopherol-rich extract (mixed, natural, can include tocotrienol)
2. E307 Alpha-tocopherol (synthetic)
3. E308 Gamma-tocopherol (synthetic)
4. E309 Delta-tocopherol (synthetic)

These E numbers include all racemic forms and acetate esters thereof. Commonly found on food labels in Europe and some other countries, their safety assessment and approval are the responsibility of the European Food Safety Authority.

== Absorption, metabolism, and excretion ==
Tocotrienols and tocopherols, the latter including the stereoisomers of synthetic alpha-tocopherol, are absorbed from the intestinal lumen, incorporated into chylomicrons, and secreted into the portal vein, leading to the liver. Absorption efficiency is estimated at 51% to 86%, and that applies to all of the vitamin E family – there is no discrimination among the vitamin E vitamers during absorption. Bile is necessary for chylomicron formation, so disease conditions such as cystic fibrosis result in biliary insufficiency and vitamin E malabsorption. When consumed as an alpha-tocopheryl acetate dietary supplement, absorption is promoted when consumed with a fat-containing meal. Unabsorbed vitamin E is excreted via feces. Additionally, vitamin E is excreted by the liver via bile into the intestinal lumen, where it will either be reabsorbed or excreted via feces, and all of the vitamin E vitamers are metabolized and then excreted via urine.

Upon reaching the liver, RRR-alpha-tocopherol is preferentially taken up by alpha-tocopherol transfer protein (α-TTP). All other forms are degraded to 2'-carboxethyl-6-hydroxychromane (CEHC), a process that involves truncating the phytic tail of the molecule, then either sulfated or glucuronidated. This renders the molecules water-soluble and leads to excretion via urine. Alpha-tocopherol is also degraded by the same process, to 2,5,7,8-tetramethyl-2-(2'-carboxyethyl)-6-hydroxychromane (α-CEHC), but more slowly because it is partially protected by α-TTP. Large intakes of α-tocopherol result in increased urinary α-CEHC, so this appears to be a means of disposing of excess vitamin E.

Alpha-tocopherol transfer protein is coded by the TTPA gene on chromosome 8. The binding site for RRR-α-tocopherol is a hydrophobic pocket with a lower affinity for beta-, gamma-, or delta-tocopherols, or for the stereoisomers with an S configuration at the chiral 2 site. Tocotrienols are also a poor fit because the double bonds in the phytic tail create a rigid configuration that is a mismatch with the α-TTP pocket. A rare genetic defect of the TTPA gene results in people exhibiting a progressive neurodegenerative disorder known as ataxia with vitamin E deficiency (AVED) despite consuming normal amounts of vitamin E. Large amounts of alpha-tocopherol as a dietary supplement are needed to compensate for the lack of α-TTP. The role of α-TTP is to move α-tocopherol to the plasma membrane of hepatocytes (liver cells), where it can be incorporated into newly created very low density lipoprotein (VLDL) molecules. These convey α-tocopherol to cells in the rest of the body. As an example of a result of the preferential treatment, the US diet delivers approximately 70 mg/d of γ-tocopherol, and plasma concentrations are on the order of 2–5 μmol/L; meanwhile, dietary α-tocopherol is about 7 mg/d, but plasma concentrations are in the range of 11–37 μmol/L.

Affinity of α-TTP for vitamin E vitamers

Vitamin E compound	Affinity
RRR-alpha-tocopherol	100%
beta-tocopherol	38%
gamma-tocopherol	9%
delta-tocopherol	2%
SSR-alpha-tocopherol	11%
alpha-tocotrienol	12%

== Medical applications ==
Vitamin E has been suggested as a supplement for helping many health conditions, mostly due to its antioxidant activity and potential to protect cells from oxidative damage. In the US, the vitamin is widely available as an over-the-counter supplement; however, medical evidence supporting its effectiveness and safety for treating or preventing a variety of health conditions is mixed. Vitamin E can also interact with some medications and other supplements. Vitamin E has been studied as a treatment for skin health and skin ageing, immune function, and managing conditions like cardiovascular disease or Alzheimer's disease (AD), or certain types of cancer. Most studies have found limited or inconclusive benefits and the potential for some risks. It is most often recommended to obtain vitamin E through a balanced diet because high-dose supplementation may have health risks. There is evidence that the sale of dietary supplement vitamin E has decreased by up to 33% following a report showing little or no effect of vitamin E in preventing cancer or cardiovascular disease.

In 2023, it was the 290th most commonly prescribed medication in the United States, with more than 500,000 prescriptions.

=== All-cause mortality ===
Two meta-analyses concluded that as a dietary supplement, vitamin E neither improved nor impaired all-cause mortality. A meta-analysis of long-term clinical trials reported a non-significant 2% increase in all-cause mortality when alpha-tocopherol was the only supplement used. The same journal article reported a statistically significant 3% increase for results when alpha-tocopherol was used in combination with other nutrients (vitamin A, vitamin C, beta-carotene, selenium).

=== Age-related macular degeneration ===
A Cochrane review concluded that there were no changes seen for risk of developing age-related macular degeneration (AMD) from long-term vitamin E supplementation and that supplementation may slightly increase the chances of developing late AMD.

=== Cognitive impairment and Alzheimer's disease ===
Two meta-analyses reported lower vitamin E blood levels in AD people compared to healthy, age-matched people. However, a review of vitamin E supplementation trials concluded that there was insufficient evidence to state that supplementation reduced the risk of developing AD or slowed the progression of AD.

=== Cancer ===
In a 2022 update of an earlier report, the United States Preventive Services Task Force recommended against the use of vitamin E supplements for the prevention of cardiovascular disease or cancer, concluding there was insufficient evidence to assess the balance of benefits and harms, yet also concluding with moderate certainty that there is no net benefit of supplementation.

As for literature on different types of cancer, an inverse relationship between dietary vitamin E and kidney cancer and bladder cancer is seen in observational studies. A large clinical trial reported no difference in bladder cancer cases between treatment and placebo.

An inverse relationship between dietary vitamin E and lung cancer was reported in observational studies, but a large clinical trial in male tobacco smokers reported no impact on lung cancer between treatment and placebo, and a trial which tracked people who chose to consume a vitamin E dietary supplement reported an increased risk of lung cancer for those consuming more than 215 mg/day.

For prostate cancer, there are also conflicting results. A meta-analysis based on serum alpha-tocopherol content reported an inverse correlation in relative risk, but a second meta-analysis of observational studies reported no such relationship. A large clinical trial with male tobacco smokers and reported a 32% decrease in the incidence of prostate cancer, but the SELECT trial of selenium or vitamin E for prostate cancer enrolled men ages 55 or older and reported relative risk 17% higher for the vitamin group.

For colorectal cancer, a systematic review of randomized clinical trials and the large SELECT trial reported no statistically significant change in relative risk. The Women's Health Study reported no significant differences for incidences of all types of cancer, cancer deaths, or specifically for breast, lung or colon cancers.

Potential confounding factors are the form of vitamin E used in prospective studies and the amounts. Synthetic, racemic mixtures of vitamin E isomers are not bioequivalent to natural, non-racemic mixtures, yet are widely used in clinical trials and as dietary supplement ingredients. One review reported a modest increase in cancer risk with vitamin E supplementation while stating that more than 90% of the cited clinical trials used the synthetic, racemic form dl-alpha-tocopherol.

==== Cancer health claims ====
The U.S. Food and Drug Administration initiated a process of reviewing and approving food and dietary supplement health claims in 1993. Reviews of petitions results in proposed claims being rejected or approved. If approved, specific wording is allowed on package labels. In 1999, a second process for claims review was created. If there is not a scientific consensus on the totality of the evidence, a Qualified Health Claim (QHC) may be established. The FDA does not "approve" qualified health claim petitions. Instead, it issues a Letter of Enforcement Discretion that includes very specific claim language and the restrictions on using that wording. The first QHCs relevant to vitamin E were issued in 2003: "Some scientific evidence suggests that consumption of antioxidant vitamins may reduce the risk of certain forms of cancer." In 2009, the claims became more specific, allowing that vitamin E might reduce the risk of renal, bladder and colorectal cancers, but with required mention that the evidence was deemed weak and the claimed benefits highly unlikely. A petition to add brain, cervical, gastric and lung cancers was rejected. A further revision, May 2012, allowed that vitamin E may reduce risk of renal, bladder and colorectal cancers, with a more concise qualifier sentence added: "FDA has concluded that there is very little scientific evidence for this claim." Any company product label making the cancer claims has to include a qualifier sentence.

=== Cataracts ===
A review measured serum tocopherol and reported higher serum concentration was associated with a 23% reduction in relative risk of age-related cataracts (ARC), with the effect due to differences in nuclear cataract rather than cortical or posterior subcapsular cataract. In contrast, meta-analyses reporting on clinical trials of alpha-tocopherol supplementation reported no statistically significant change to risk of ARC compared to placebo.

=== Cardiovascular diseases ===
In a 2022 update of an earlier report, the United States Preventive Services Task Force recommended against the use of vitamin E supplements for the prevention of cardiovascular disease or cancer, concluding there was insufficient evidence to assess the balance of benefits and harms, yet also concluding with moderate certainty that there is no net benefit of supplementation.

Research on the effects of vitamin E on cardiovascular disease has produced conflicting results. In theory, oxidative modification of LDL-cholesterol promotes blockages in coronary arteries that lead to atherosclerosis and heart attacks, so vitamin E functioning as an antioxidant would reduce oxidized cholesterol and lower risk of cardiovascular disease. Vitamin E status has also been implicated in the maintenance of normal endothelial cell function of cells lining the inner surface of arteries, anti-inflammatory activity and inhibition of platelet adhesion and aggregation. An inverse relation has been observed between coronary heart disease and the consumption of foods high in vitamin E, and also higher serum concentration of alpha-tocopherol. The problem with observational studies is that these cannot confirm a relation between the lower risk of coronary heart disease and vitamin E consumption diets higher in vitamin E may also be higher in other, unidentified components that promote heart health, or lower in diet components detrimental to heart health, or people choosing such diets may be making other healthy lifestyle choices.

A meta-analysis of randomized clinical trials (RCTs) reported that when consumed without any other antioxidant nutrient, the relative risk of heart attack was reduced by 18%. However, two large trials that were incorporated into the meta-analysis either did not show any benefit for heart attack, stroke, coronary mortality or all-cause mortality, or else a higher risk of heart failure in the alpha-tocopherol group.

Vitamin E supplementation does not reduce the incidence of ischemic or hemorrhagic stroke. However, supplementation of vitamin E with other antioxidants reduced risk of ischemic stroke by 9% while increased the risk for hemorrhagic stroke by 22%.

==== Denial of cardiovascular health claims ====
In 2001, the U.S. Food and Drug Administration rejected proposed health claims for vitamin E and cardiovascular health. The U.S. National Institutes of Health reviewed literature published up to 2008 and concluded "In general, clinical trials have not provided evidence that routine use of vitamin E supplements prevents cardiovascular disease or reduces its morbidity and mortality." The European Food Safety Authority (EFSA) reviews proposed health claims for the European Union countries. In 2010, the EFSA reviewed and rejected claims that a cause and effect relationship has been established between the dietary intake of vitamin E and maintenance of normal cardiac function or of normal blood circulation.

=== Nonalcoholic fatty liver disease ===
Supplemental vitamin E significantly reduced elevated liver enzymes, steatosis, inflammation and fibrosis, suggesting that the vitamin may be useful for treatment of nonalcoholic fatty liver disease (NAFLD) and the more extreme subset known as nonalcoholic steatohepatitis (NASH) in adults, but not in children.

=== Exercise recovery ===
In healthy adults, after exercise, vitamin E was shown to not have any benefits for post-exercise recovery, as measured by muscle soreness and muscle strength, or measured by indicators for inflammation or muscle damage, such as interleukin-6 and creatine kinase.

=== Parkinson's disease ===
For Parkinson's disease, there is an observed inverse correlation seen with dietary vitamin E, but no confirming evidence from placebo-controlled clinical trials.

=== Pregnancy ===
Supplementation with a combination of vitamins E and C during pregnancy is not recommended by the World Health Organization. A Cochrane review concluded there was no support for the combination reducing risk of stillbirth, neonatal death, preterm birth, preeclampsia, or any other maternal or infant outcomes, either in healthy women or those considered at risk for pregnancy complications.

=== Topical applications ===
There is widespread use of tocopheryl acetate in some skincare and wound-treatment products as a topical medication, with claims for improved wound healing and reduced scar tissue, but reviews have repeatedly concluded that there is insufficient evidence to support these claims. There are also reports of allergic contact dermatitis from use of vitamin-E derivatives such as tocopheryl linoleate and tocopherol acetate in skin care products.

== Vaping-associated lung injury ==
The US Centers for Disease Control and Prevention (CDC) stated in February 2020 that previous research suggested inhaled vitamin E acetate (α-tocopheryl acetate) may interfere with normal lung functioning. In September 2019, the US Food and Drug Administration had announced that vape liquids linked to recent vaping related lung disease outbreak in the United States tested positive for vitamin E acetate which had been used as a thickening agent by illicit THC vape cartridge manufacturers. By November 2019, the CDC had identified vitamin E acetate as a very strong culprit of concern in the vaping-related illnesses, but has not ruled out other chemicals or toxicants as possible causes. These findings were based on fluid samples from the lungs of people with vaping-associated pulmonary injury. Pyrolysis of vitamin E acetate produces exceptionally toxic ketene gas, along with carcinogenic alkenes and benzene.

== History ==
Vitamin E was discovered in 1922 by Herbert McLean Evans and Katharine Scott Bishop, first identified as a certain unknown substance necessary for fertility. Specifically, female rats raised on a diet of pure fat, carbohydrate, protein, salt, vitamins A and B were healthy in all apparent aspects, but they cannot carry a pregnancy to term, because they always reabsorb the fetus. Fertility is restored by supplementing the diet with certain foods (such as lettuce). Thus it was determined that a certain "anti-sterility vitamine" was present in these foods. This was the basis of a classical method for bioassaying the bioactivity of the various forms of vitamin E: the rat fetal resorption bioassay.

Evans and collaborators used this to measure the presence and equivalent concentrations of vitamin E in many substances. For example, they measured the presence, concentration, and rate of decay of vitamin E storage in various body parts by "cannibal experiments". Rats fed on a scheduled diet of vitamin E were sacrificed daily, and their tissues were fed to sterile rats raised on the vitamin E-free diet. This restored fertility. It was also established that vitamin E is transferred intrauterinely from mother to pup, because sacrificed newborn pups can restore fertility.

Vitamin E was first isolated in a pure form by Evans and Gladys Anderson Emerson in 1935 at the University of California, Berkeley. It was given the name "tocopherol" from the Greek words "τόκος" [tókos, birth], and "φέρειν", [phérein, to bear or carry] meaning in sum "to carry a pregnancy," with the ending "-ol" signifying its status as a chemical alcohol. George M. Calhoun, Professor of Greek at the University of California, was credited with helping with the naming process. Erhard Fernholz elucidated its structure in 1938 and shortly afterward the same year, Paul Karrer and his team first synthesized it.

It was known since the 19th century that certain plants contain substances that prevent fat from going rancid. In 1937, it was found that vitamin E was specifically responsible for this. This led to the hypothesis that vitamin E's mechanism of action is as an antioxidant that prevents pathogenic oxidation of lipid and lipoprotein, specifically in biological membranes.

Nearly 50 years after the discovery of vitamin E, an editorial in the Journal of the American Medical Association titled "Vitamin in search of a disease" read in part "...research revealed many of the vitamin's secrets, but no certain therapeutic use and no definite deficiency disease in man." The animal discovery experiments had been a requirement for successful pregnancy, but no benefits were observed for women prone to miscarriage. Evidence for vascular health was characterized as unconvincing. The editorial closed with mention of some preliminary human evidence for protection against hemolytic anemia in young children.

A role for vitamin E in coronary heart disease was first proposed in 1946 by Evan Shute and colleagues. More cardiovascular work from the same research group followed, including a proposal that megadoses of vitamin E could slow down and even reverse the development of atherosclerosis. Subsequent research showed no association between vitamin E supplementation and cardiovascular events such as nonfatal stroke or myocardial infarction, or cardiovascular mortality.

There is a long history of belief that topical application of vitamin E containing oil benefits burn and wound healing. This belief persists even though scientific reviews refuted this claim.

The role of vitamin E in infant nutrition has a long research history. From 1949 onward there were trials with premature infants suggesting that oral alpha-tocopherol was protective against edema, intracranial hemorrhage, hemolytic anemia and retrolental fibroplasia. A more recent review concluded that vitamin E supplementation in preterm infants reduced the risk of intracranial hemorrhage and retinopathy, but noted an increased risk of sepsis.
