= Β-Tocopherol =

β-Tocopherol
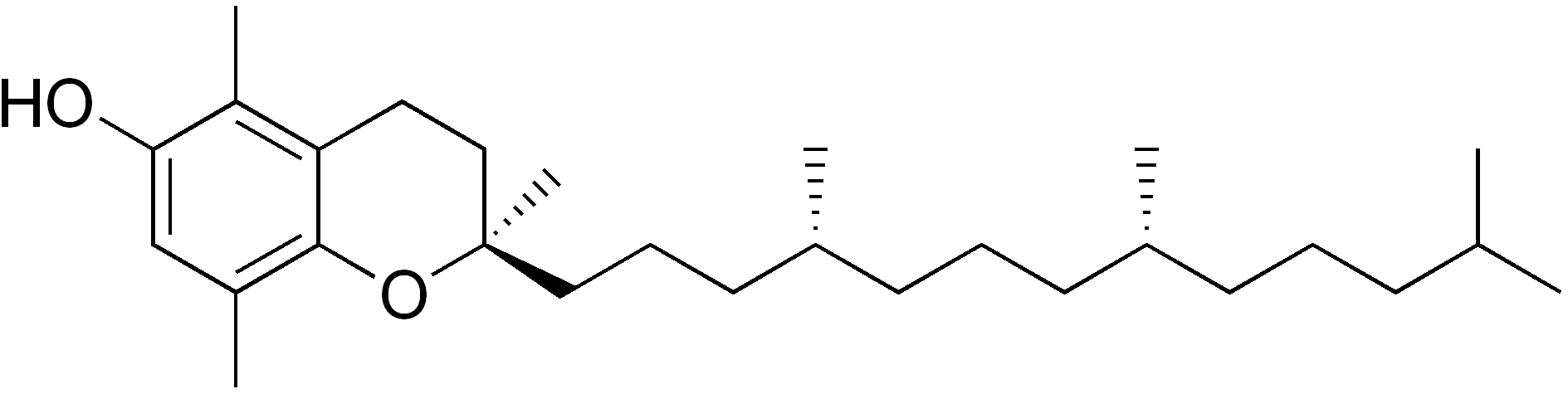

Names
- Preferred IUPAC name (2R)-2,5,8-Trimethyl-2-[(4R,8R)-4,8,12-trimethyltridecyl]-3,4-dihydro-2H-1-benzopyran-6-ol

Identifiers
CAS Number	16698-35-4
3D model (JSmol)	Interactive image
Beilstein Reference	93070
ChEBI	CHEBI:47771
ChemSpider	5256784
ECHA InfoCard	100.037.028
EC Number	240-747-1
KEGG	C14152
PubChem CID	86052
UNII	9U6A490501
CompTox Dashboard (EPA)	DTXSID10873424 DTXSID30884931, DTXSID10873424
- InChI: InChI=1S/C28H48O2/c1-20(2)11-8-12-21(3)13-9-14-22(4)15-10-17-28(7)18-16-25-24(6)26(29)19-23(5)27(25)30-28/h19-22,29H,8-18H2,1-7H3/t21-,22-,28-/m1/s1 Key: WGVKWNUPNGFDFJ-DQCZWYHMSA-N
- SMILES: C[C@H](CCC[C@H](C)CCCC(C)C)CCC[C@@]2(C)OC1=C(C)C=C(O)C(C)=C1CC2

Properties
Chemical formula	C_{28}H_{48}O_{2}
Molar mass	416.68 g/mol
- Except where otherwise noted, data are given for materials in their standard state (at 25 °C [77 °F], 100 kPa). verify (what is ?) Infobox references

β-Tocopherol (beta-tocopherol) is a type of tocopherol with formula C_{28}H_{48}O_{2}.
