= Thiamine deficiency =

Human disease

- Other names: Beriberi, vitamin B_{1} deficiency, thiamine-deficiency syndrome
- Sufferer of beriberi in Malaysia, early 20th century
- Specialty: Neurology, cardiology, pediatrics
- Symptoms: Wet: Fast heart rate, shortness of breath, leg swelling; Dry: Numbness, confusion, trouble moving the legs, pain
- Types: Wet, dry, gastrointestinal, infantile, cerebral
- Causes: Not enough thiamine
- Risk factors: Diet of mostly white rice; alcoholism, dialysis, chronic diarrhea, diuretics
- Prevention: Food fortification, Food diversification
- Treatment: Thiamine supplementation
- Frequency: Uncommon (United States)

Thiamine deficiency is a medical condition of low levels of thiamine (vitamin B_{1}). A severe and chronic form is known as beriberi. The name beriberi was possibly borrowed in the 18th century from the Sinhalese phrase බැරි බැරි (bæri bæri, "I cannot, I cannot"), owing to the weakness caused by the condition. The two main types in adults are wet beriberi and dry beriberi. Wet beriberi affects the cardiovascular system, resulting in a fast heart rate, shortness of breath, and leg swelling. Dry beriberi affects the nervous system, resulting in numbness of the hands and feet, confusion, trouble moving the legs, and pain. A form with loss of appetite and constipation may also occur. Another type, acute beriberi, found mostly in babies, presents with loss of appetite, vomiting, lactic acidosis, changes in heart rate, and enlargement of the heart.

Risk factors include a diet of mostly white rice, alcoholism, dialysis, chronic diarrhea, and taking high doses of diuretics. In rare cases, it may be due to a genetic condition that results in difficulties absorbing thiamine found in food. Wernicke encephalopathy and Korsakoff syndrome are forms of dry beriberi. Diagnosis is based on symptoms, low levels of thiamine in the urine, high blood lactate, and improvement with thiamine supplementation.

Treatment is by thiamine supplementation, either by mouth or by injection. With treatment, symptoms generally resolve in a few weeks. The disease may be prevented at the population level through the fortification of food.

Thiamine deficiency is rare in most of the developed world. It remains relatively common in sub-Saharan Africa. Outbreaks have been seen in refugee camps. Thiamine deficiency has been described for thousands of years in Asia, and became more common in the late 1800s with the increased processing of rice.

== Signs and symptoms ==
Symptoms of beriberi include weight loss, emotional disturbances, impaired sensory perception, weakness and pain in the limbs, and periods of irregular heart rate. Edema (swelling of bodily tissues) is common. It may increase the amount of lactic acid and pyruvic acid within the blood. In advanced cases, the disease may cause high-output cardiac failure and death.

Symptoms may occur concurrently with those of Wernicke's encephalopathy, a primarily neurological thiamine deficiency-related condition.

Beriberi is divided into four categories. The first three are historical and the fourth, gastrointestinal beriberi, was recognized in 2004:

- Dry beriberi especially affects the peripheral nervous system.
- Wet beriberi especially affects the cardiovascular system and other bodily systems.
- Infantile beriberi affects the babies of malnourished mothers.
- Gastrointestinal beriberi affects the digestive system and other bodily systems.

=== Dry beriberi ===
Dry beriberi causes wasting and partial paralysis resulting from damaged peripheral nerves. It is also referred to as endemic neuritis. It is characterized by:

- Difficulty with walking
- Tingling or loss of sensation (numbness) in hands and feet
- Loss of tendon reflexes
- Loss of muscle function or paralysis of the lower legs
- Mental confusion/speech difficulties
- Pain
- Involuntary eye movements (nystagmus)
- Vomiting

A selective impairment of the large proprioceptive sensory fibers without motor impairment can occur and present as a prominent sensory ataxia, which is a loss of balance and coordination due to loss of the proprioceptive inputs from the periphery and loss of position sense.

=== Brain disease ===
Wernicke's encephalopathy (WE), Korsakoff syndrome (also called alcohol amnestic disorder), and Wernicke–Korsakoff syndrome are forms of dry beriberi.

Wernicke's encephalopathy is the most frequently encountered manifestation of thiamine deficiency in Western society, though it may also occur in patients with impaired nutrition from other causes, such as gastrointestinal disease, those with HIV/AIDS, and with the injudicious administration of parenteral glucose or hyperalimentation without adequate B-vitamin supplementation. This is a striking neuro-psychiatric disorder characterized by paralysis of eye movements, abnormal stance and gait, and markedly deranged mental function.

Korsakoff syndrome, in general, is considered to occur with deterioration of brain function in patients initially diagnosed with WE. This is an amnestic-confabulatory syndrome characterized by retrograde and anterograde amnesia, impairment of conceptual functions, and decreased spontaneity and initiative.

Alcoholics may have thiamine deficiency because of:

- Inadequate nutritional intake: Alcoholics tend to take in less than the recommended amount of thiamine.
- Decreased uptake of thiamine from the GI tract: Active transport of thiamine into enterocytes is disturbed during acute alcohol exposure.
- Liver thiamine stores are reduced due to hepatic steatosis or fibrosis.
- Impaired thiamine utilization: Magnesium, which is required for the binding of thiamine to thiamine-using enzymes within the cell, is also deficient due to chronic alcohol consumption. The inefficient use of any thiamine that does reach the cells will further exacerbate the thiamine deficiency.
- Ethanol per se inhibits thiamine transport in the gastrointestinal system and blocks phosphorylation of thiamine to its cofactor form (ThDP).

Following improved nutrition and the removal of alcohol consumption, some impairments linked with thiamine deficiency are reversed, in particular poor brain functionality, although in more severe cases, Wernicke–Korsakoff syndrome leaves permanent damage. (See delirium tremens.)

=== Wet beriberi ===
Wet beriberi affects the heart and circulatory system. It is sometimes fatal, as it causes a combination of heart failure and weakening of the capillary walls, which causes the peripheral tissues to become edematous. Wet beriberi is characterized by:

- Increased heart rate
- Vasodilation leading to decreased systemic vascular resistance, and high-output heart failure
- Elevated jugular venous pressure
- Dyspnea (shortness of breath) on exertion
- Paroxysmal nocturnal dyspnea
- Peripheral edema (swelling of lower legs) or generalized edema (swelling throughout the body)
- Dilated cardiomyopathy

=== Gastrointestinal beriberi ===
Gastrointestinal beriberi causes abdominal pain. It is characterized by:

- Abdominal pain
- Nausea
- Vomiting
- Lactic acidosis

=== Infants ===
Infantile beriberi usually occurs between two and six months of age in children whose mothers have inadequate thiamine intake. It may present as either wet or dry beriberi.

In the acute form, the baby develops dyspnea and cyanosis and soon dies of heart failure. These symptoms may be described in infantile beriberi:

- Hoarseness, where the child makes moves to moan, but emits no sound or just faint moans caused by nerve paralysis
- Weight loss, becoming thinner and then marasmic as the disease progresses
- Vomiting
- Diarrhea
- Pale skin
- Edema
- Ill temper
- Alterations of the cardiovascular system, especially tachycardia (rapid heart rate)
- Convulsions occasionally observed in the terminal stages

== Cause ==
Beriberi is often caused by eating a diet with a very high proportion of calorie-rich white rice (common in Asia) or cassava root (common in sub-Saharan Africa), without much if any thiamine-containing animal products or vegetables.

It may also be caused by shortcomings other than inadequate intake – diseases or operations on the digestive tract, alcoholism, dialysis or genetic deficiencies. All those causes mainly affect the central nervous system, and provoke the development of Wernicke's encephalopathy.

Wernicke's disease is one of the most prevalent neurological or neuropsychiatric diseases. In autopsy series, features of Wernicke lesions are observed in approximately 2% of general cases. Medical record research shows that about 85% had not been diagnosed, although only 19% would be asymptomatic. In children, only 58% were diagnosed. In alcohol abusers, autopsy series showed neurological damages at rates of 12.5% or more. Mortality caused by Wernicke's disease reaches 17% of diseases, which means 3.4/1000 or about 25 million contemporaries. The number of people with Wernicke's disease may be even higher, considering that early stages may have dysfunctions prior to the production of observable lesions at necropsy. In addition, uncounted numbers of people can experience fetal damage and subsequent diseases.

=== Genetics ===
Genetic diseases of thiamine transport are rare but serious. Thiamine responsive megaloblastic anemia syndrome (TRMA) with diabetes mellitus and sensorineural deafness is an autosomal recessive disorder caused by mutations in the gene SLC19A2, a high affinity thiamine transporter. TRMA patients do not show signs of systemic thiamine deficiency, suggesting redundancy in the thiamine transport system. This has led to the discovery of a second high-affinity thiamine transporter, SLC19A3. Leigh disease (subacute necrotising encephalomyelopathy) is an inherited disorder that affects mostly infants in the first years of life and is invariably fatal. Pathological similarities between Leigh disease and WE led to the hypothesis that the cause was a defect in thiamine metabolism. One of the most consistent findings has been an abnormality of the activation of the pyruvate dehydrogenase complex.

Mutations in the SLC19A3 gene have been linked to biotin-thiamine responsive basal ganglia disease, which is treated with pharmacological doses of thiamine and biotin, another B vitamin.

Other disorders in which a putative role for thiamine has been implicated include subacute necrotising encephalomyelopathy, opsoclonus myoclonus syndrome (a paraneoplastic syndrome), and Nigerian seasonal ataxia (or African seasonal ataxia). In addition, several inherited disorders of ThDP-dependent enzymes have been reported, which may respond to thiamine treatment.

== Pathophysiology ==
Thiamine in the human body has a half-life of 17 days and is quickly exhausted, particularly when metabolic demands exceed intake. A derivative of thiamine, thiamine pyrophosphate (TPP), is a cofactor involved in the citric acid cycle, as well as connecting the breakdown of sugars with the citric acid cycle. The citric acid cycle is a central metabolic pathway involved in the regulation of carbohydrate, lipid, and amino acid metabolism, and its disruption due to thiamine deficiency inhibits the production of many molecules including the neurotransmitters glutamic acid and GABA. Additionally, thiamine may also be directly involved in neuromodulation.

== Diagnosis ==
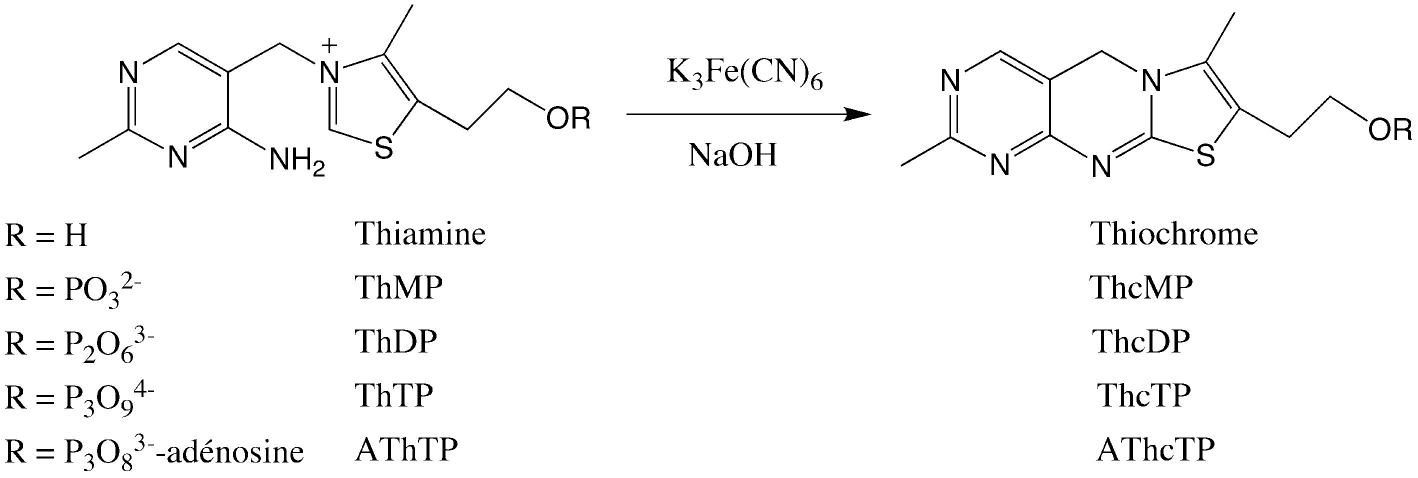
Oxidation of thiamine derivatives to fluorescent thiochromes by potassium ferricyanide under alkaline conditions

A positive diagnosis test for thiamine deficiency involves measuring the activity of the enzyme transketolase in erythrocytes (erythrocyte transketolase activation assay). Alternatively, thiamine and its phosphorylated derivatives can directly be detected in whole blood, tissues, foods, animal feed, and pharmaceutical preparations following the conversion of thiamine to fluorescent thiochrome derivatives (thiochrome assay) and separation by high-performance liquid chromatography. Capillary electrophoresis techniques and in-capillary enzyme reaction methods have emerged as alternative techniques in quantifying and monitoring thiamine levels in samples. The normal thiamine concentration in EDTA-blood is about 20–100 μg/L.

== Treatment ==
Many people with beriberi can be treated with thiamine alone. Given thiamine intravenously (and later orally), rapid and dramatic recovery occurs, generally within 24 hours.

Improvements of peripheral neuropathy may require several months of thiamine treatment.

== Epidemiology ==
Beriberi is a recurrent nutritional disease in detention houses, even in this century. In 1999, an outbreak of beriberi occurred in a detention center in Taiwan. High rates of illness and death from beriberi in overcrowded Haitian jails in 2007 were traced to the traditional practice of washing rice before cooking; this removed a nutritious coating which had been applied to the rice after processing (enriched white rice). In the Ivory Coast, among a group of prisoners with heavy punishment, 64% were affected by beriberi. Before beginning treatment, prisoners exhibited symptoms of dry or wet beriberi with neurological signs (tingling: 41%), cardiovascular signs (dyspnoea: 42%, thoracic pain: 35%), and edemas of the lower limbs (51%). With treatment, the rate of healing was about 97%.

Populations under extreme stress may be at higher risk for beriberi. Displaced populations, such as refugees from war, are susceptible to micronutritional deficiency, including beriberi. The severe nutritional deprivation caused by famine also can cause beriberi, although symptoms may be overlooked in clinical assessment or masked by other famine-related problems. An extreme weight-loss diet can, rarely, induce a famine-like state and the accompanying beriberi.

Workers on Chinese squid ships are at elevated risk of beriberi due to the cheap refined grain and raw fish diet they are fed and the long period of time between shoring. Between 2013 and 2021, 15 workers on 14 ships have died with symptoms of beriberi.

== History ==
The earliest written descriptions of thiamine deficiency are from ancient China in the context of Chinese medicine. One of the earliest is by Ge Hong in his book Zhou hou bei ji fang (Emergency Formulas to Keep up Your Sleeve) written sometime during the third century. Hong called the illness by the name jiao qi, which can be interpreted as "foot qi". He described the symptoms to include swelling, weakness, and numbness of the feet. He also acknowledged that the illness could be deadly, and claimed that it could be cured by eating certain foods, such as fermented soybeans in wine. Better known examples of early descriptions of "foot qi" are by Chao Yuanfang (who lived during 550–630) in his book Zhu bing yuan hou lun (Sources and Symptoms of All Diseases) and by Sun Simiao (581–682) in his book Bei ji qian jin yao fang (Essential Emergency Formulas Worth a Thousand in Gold).

In the mid-19th century, interest in beriberi steadily rose as the disease became more noticeable with changes in diet in East and Southeast Asia. A steady uptick occurred in medical publications, reaching 181 publications from 1880 and 1889, and hundreds more in the following decades. The link to white rice was clear to Western doctors, but a confounding factor was that some other foods such as meat failed to prevent beriberi, so it could not be easily explained as a lack of known chemicals like carbon or nitrogen. With no knowledge of vitamins, the etiology of beriberi was among the most hotly debated subjects in Victorian medicine.

During the Edo period of Japan, the consumption of polished white rice, once largely restricted to the upper classes, began to spread among lower-ranking samurai and urban townspeople, often forming the bulk of their diet with few side dishes. This dietary shift contributed to the rising prevalence of beriberi, particularly in major cities such as Kyoto, Nagoya, Edo (modern Tokyo), and Osaka by the late 17th century. In contrast, rural populations and farmers, who relied on mixed grains and less refined brown rice with higher thiamine content, were largely spared from the disease. With the onset of the Meiji era and its accompanying economic growth, refined white rice became more widely accessible across social classes. The resulting popularization of a polished white rice diet contributed to the nationwide spread of beriberi, which came to be regarded as a disease endemic to Japan.

=== Successful prevention and identification ===
The first successful preventive measure against beriberi was discovered by Takaki Kanehiro, a British-trained Japanese medical doctor of the Imperial Japanese Navy, in the mid-1880s. Beriberi was a serious problem in the Japanese navy; sailors fell ill an average of four times a year in the period 1878 to 1881, and 35% were cases of beriberi. In 1882, Takaki learned of a very high incidence of beriberi among cadets on a training mission from Japan to Hawaii, via New Zealand and South America. The voyage lasted more than nine months and resulted in 169 cases of sickness and 25 deaths on a ship of 376 men. Takaki observed that beriberi was common among low-ranking crew who were often provided free rice, thus ate little else, but not among crews of Western navies, nor among Japanese officers who consumed a more varied diet. With the support of the Japanese Navy, he conducted an experiment in which another ship was deployed on the same route, except that its crew was fed a diet of meat, fish, barley, rice, and beans. At the end of the voyage, this crew had only 14 cases of beriberi and no deaths. Takaki's results of his experiment impressed the Japanese Navy, which adopted his proposed solution. By 1887, beriberi had been eliminated on Navy ships.

In the same year, Takaki's experiment was described favorably in The Lancet, but his nutritional deficiency etiology was not taken seriously, with Western medicine overwhelmingly favoring miasmatic theories, believing the disease to be caused either by microorganisms or toxins. Takaki's theory, while incorrectly focusing on macronutrients, was a step in the right direction that resulted in correct treatment. However, keen-eyed observers were able to easily rebut Takaki's theories with counterexamples, so nutritional theories remained heterodox science. In 1897, Christiaan Eijkman, a Dutch physician and pathologist, published his mid-1880s experiments showing that feeding unpolished rice (instead of the polished variety) to chickens helped to prevent beriberi. This was the first experiment to show that not a major chemical, but some minor nutrient, was the true cause of beriberi. The following year, Sir Frederick Hopkins postulated that some foods contained "accessory factors"—in addition to proteins, carbohydrates, fats, and salt—that were necessary for the functions of the human body. In 1901, Gerrit Grijns, a Dutch physician and assistant to Christiaan Eijkman in the Netherlands, correctly interpreted beriberi as a deficiency syndrome, and between 1910 and 1913, Edward Bright Vedder established that an extract of rice bran is a treatment for beriberi. In 1929, Eijkman and Hopkins were awarded the Nobel Prize for Physiology or Medicine for their discoveries. In 1935, Robert R. Williams isolated and cheaply synthesized thiamine from rice bran, based on discoveries he had made as a researcher in Manila's Bureau of Science in 1910. Williams assigned the patents to a fund that worked to promote thiamine-enriched rice in Asia, and in Bataan in particular.

=== Japanese Army denialism ===
Although the identification of beriberi as a deficiency syndrome was proven beyond a doubt by 1913, a Japanese group headed by Mori Ōgai and backed by Tokyo Imperial University continued to deny this conclusion until 1926. In 1886, Mori, then working in the Japanese Army Medical Bureau, asserted that white rice was sufficient as a diet for soldiers. Simultaneously, Navy surgeon general Takaki Kanehiro published the groundbreaking results described above. Mori, who had been educated under German doctors, responded that Takaki was a "fake doctor" due to his lack of prestigious medical background, while Mori himself and his fellow graduates of Tokyo Imperial University constituted the only "real doctors" in Japan and that they alone were capable of "experimental induction", although Mori himself had not conducted any beriberi experiments.

The Japanese Navy sided with Takaki and adopted his suggestions. To prevent the Army and himself from losing face, Mori assembled a team of doctors and professors from Tokyo Imperial University and the Japanese Army, who proposed that beriberi was caused by an unknown pathogen, which they described as etowasu (from the German etwas, meaning "something"). They employed various social tactics to denounce vitamin deficiency experiments and prevent them from being published, while beriberi ravaged the Japanese Army. During the First Sino-Japanese War and Russo-Japanese War, Army soldiers continued to die in mass numbers from beriberi, while Navy sailors survived. In response to this severe loss of life, in 1907, the Army ordered the formation of a Beriberi Emergency Research Council, headed by Mori. Its members pledged to find the cause of beriberi. By 1919, with most Western doctors acknowledging that beriberi was a deficiency syndrome, the Emergency Research Council began conducting experiments using various vitamins, but stressed that "more research was necessary". During this period, more than 300,000 Japanese soldiers contracted beriberi and over 27,000 died.

Mori died in 1922. The Beriberi Research Council disbanded in 1925, and by the time Eijkman and Hopkins were awarded the Nobel Prize, all of its members had acknowledged that beriberi was a deficiency syndrome.

=== Etymology ===
Although according to the Oxford English Dictionary, the term "beriberi" comes from a Sinhalese phrase meaning "weak, weak" or "I cannot, I cannot", the word being duplicated for emphasis, the origin of the phrase is questionable. It has also been suggested to come from Hindi, Arabic, and a few other languages, with many meanings like "weakness", "sailor", and even "sheep". Such suggested origins were listed by Heinrich Botho Scheube, among others. Edward Vedder wrote in his book Beriberi (1913) that "it is impossible to definitely trace the origin of the word beriberi". The word berbere was used in writing at least as early as 1568 by Diogo do Couto, when he described the deficiency in India.

Kakke (脚気), which is a Japanese synonym for thiamine deficiency, comes from the way "jiao qi" is pronounced in Japanese. "Jiao qi" is an old word used in Chinese medicine to describe beriberi. "Kakke" is supposed to have entered into the Japanese language sometime between the sixth and eighth centuries.

== Other animals ==
=== Poultry ===
Mature chickens show signs three weeks after being fed a deficient diet. In young chicks, it can appear before two weeks of age. Onset is sudden in young chicks, with anorexia and an unsteady gait. Later on, locomotor signs begin, with an apparent paralysis of the flexor of the toes. The characteristic position is called "stargazing", with the affected animal sitting on its hocks with its head thrown back in a posture called opisthotonos. Response to administration of the vitamin is rather quick, occurring a few hours later.

=== Ruminants ===
Polioencephalomalacia (PEM) is the most common thiamine deficiency disorder in young ruminant and nonruminant animals. Symptoms of PEM include a profuse, but transient, diarrhea, listlessness, circling movements, stargazing or opisthotonus (head drawn back over neck), and muscle tremors. The most common cause is high-carbohydrate feeds, leading to the overgrowth of thiaminase-producing bacteria, but dietary ingestion of thiaminase (e.g., in bracken fern), or inhibition of thiamine absorption by high sulfur intake are also possible. Another cause of PEM is Clostridium sporogenes or Bacillus aneurinolyticus infection. These bacteria produce thiaminases that can cause an acute thiamine deficiency in the affected animal.

=== Snakes ===
Snakes that consume a diet largely composed of goldfish and feeder minnows are susceptible to developing thiamine deficiency. This is often a problem observed in captivity when keeping garter and ribbon snakes that are fed a goldfish-exclusive diet, as these fish contain thiaminase, an enzyme that breaks down thiamine.

=== Wild birds and fish ===
Thiamine deficiency has been identified as the cause of a paralytic disease affecting wild birds in the Baltic Sea area dating back to 1982. In this condition, there is difficulty in keeping the wings folded along the side of the body when resting, loss of the ability to fly and voice, with eventual paralysis of the wings and legs and death. It affects primarily 0.5–1 kg-sized birds such as the European herring gull (Larus argentatus), common starling (Sturnus vulgaris), and common eider (Somateria mollissima). Researchers noted, "Because the investigated species occupy a wide range of ecological niches and positions in the food web, we are open to the possibility that other animal classes may develop thiamine deficiency, as well."^{p. 12006}

In the counties of Blekinge and Skåne, mass deaths of several bird species, especially the European herring gull, have been observed since the early 2000s. More recently, species of other classes seems to be affected. High mortality of salmon (Salmo salar) in the river Mörrumsån is reported, and mammals such as the Eurasian elk (Alces alces) have died in unusually high numbers. Lack of thiamine is the common denominator where analysis is done. In April 2012, the County Administrative Board of Blekinge found the situation so alarming that they asked the Swedish government to set up a closer investigation.
