= Wernicke syndrome =

Wernicke syndrome is an ambiguous term. It may refer to:

- Wernicke aphasia: the eponymous term for receptive or sensory aphasia.
- Wernicke encephalopathy: an acute neurological syndrome of ophthalmoparesis, ataxia, and encephalopathy brought on by thiamine deficiency.
- Wernicke–Korsakoff syndrome, also called Korsakoff psychosis: a subacute dementia syndrome, often following Wernicke encephalopathy, characterized clinically by confabulation and clinicopathologically correlated with degeneration of the mammillary bodies.

== See also ==
- Carl Wernicke (1848–1905), the neurologist who described all of these syndromes.
- Wernicke's area, named after Carl Wernicke, a brain region associated with the understanding of written and spoken language.
