= Thiamine transporter =

Thia_YuaJ

Identifiers
- Symbol: Thia_YuaJ
- Pfam: PF09515
- Pfam clan: CL0315
- InterPro: IPR012651
- OPM superfamily: 134
- OPM protein: 3rlb
Available protein structures:
- PDB: IPR012651 PF09515 (ECOD; PDBsum)
- AlphaFold: IPR012651; PF09515

Members of this protein family have been assigned as thiamine transporters by a phylogenomic analysis of families of genes regulated by the THI element, a broadly conserved RNA secondary structure element through which thiamine pyrophosphate (TPP) levels can regulate transcription of many genes related to thiamine transport, salvage, and de novo biosynthesis. Species with this protein always lack the ThiBPQ ABC transporter. In some species (e.g. Streptococcus mutans and Streptococcus pyogenes), yuaJ is the only THI-regulated gene. Evidence from Bacillus cereus indicates thiamine uptake is coupled to proton translocation.

This family includes human solute transporters SLC19A1, SLC19A2 and SLC19A3.
