= Banana bag =

Bag of IV fluids containing vitamins and minerals

A banana bag (or rally pack) is a bag of IV fluids containing vitamins and minerals. The bags typically contain thiamine, folic acid, and magnesium sulfate, and are usually used to correct nutritional deficiencies or electrolyte imbalances in the human body. The solution has a yellow color, hence the term "banana bag".

== Composition ==
The typical composition of a banana bag is 1 liter of normal saline (sodium chloride 0.9%) with:

- Thiamine 100 mg
- Folic acid 1 mg
- Multivitamin for infusion (MVI), 1 ampule
- Magnesium sulfate 3 g

The solution is typically infused over four to eight hours. The yellow color comes from the riboflavin in the MVI and the folic acid. The typical composition is not optimal based on current evidence; see the Flannery et al. (2016) citation.

== Uses ==
=== Alcoholism ===
Banana bags are often prescribed for alcoholics. Chronic alcoholism can lead to a lack of thiamine, potentially causing Wernicke–Korsakoff syndrome. Chronic alcoholics can also have magnesium deficiency.

A 2016 review found that the amount of thiamine in a conventional banana bag is inadequate for prevention or treatment for ICU patients. The proposed regimen is 200–500 mg IV thiamine every eight hours for the first day of admission. Less evidence exists for the use of magnesium and folic acid, for which a smaller change in dosage is proposed. No evidence for the use of multi-vitamins are found for alcoholics.

Vitamin C is proposed to be added based on the prevalence of low blood levels among alcoholics, but its usefulness is undefined. Using a base of dextrose solution instead of saline is proposed in case of alcoholic ketoacidosis.

Banana bags (more narrowly, thiamine) are under-used when alcoholics present to the hospital with illnesses other than alcohol withdrawal, especially for critical illnesses such as sepsis, traumatic brain injury, and diabetic ketoacidosis. Using thiamine on septic alcoholics seems to reduce the rate of death.

=== Intensive care ===
Banana bags are used in the intensive care unit to correct acute magnesium deficiencies, a common occurrence in the ICU. Magnesium is stated to be beneficial for patients with terminal illness because deficiency can cause nerve pain and muscle cramps.

== Pharmacokinetics ==
Thiamine is known to have low oral bioavailbility. An intravenous injection such as the banana bag circumvents this issue. There remains an issue with the slow active transfer of thiamine across the blood-brain barrier, which can be alleviated using higher doses to encourage passive transfer.

== See also ==
- Alcohol intoxication § Management
- Intravenous therapy
- Management of dehydration
