= Thiaminase =

Class of enzymes

Thiamine pyridinylase

Identifiers
- EC no.: 2.5.1.2
- CAS no.: 9030-35-7

Databases
- BRENDA: enzyme data
- ExPASy: NiceZyme view
- KEGG: enzyme entry
- MetaCyc: metabolic pathway
- Rhea: reactions
- PDB structures: RCSB PDB PDBe PDBsum
Search
- PMC: articles
- PubMed: articles
- NCBI: proteins

Aminopyrimidine aminohydrolase

Identifiers
- EC no.: 3.5.99.2

Databases
- BRENDA: enzyme data
- ExPASy: NiceZyme view
- KEGG: enzyme entry
- MetaCyc: metabolic pathway
- Rhea: reactions
- PDB structures: RCSB PDB PDBe PDBsum
- Gene Ontology: AmiGO / QuickGO
Search
- PMC: articles
- PubMed: articles
- NCBI: proteins

Thiamine

Thiaminase is an enzyme that metabolizes or breaks down thiamine into pyrimidine and thiazole. It is an antinutrient when consumed.

The old name was "aneurinase".

There are two types with different Enzyme Commission numbers:

- Thiamine pyridinylase, Thiaminase I (EC 2.5.1.2, InterPro: IPR030901)
  - pyridine + thiamine <=> 5-(2-hydroxyethyl)-4-methylthiazole + heteropyrithiamine
  - Secreted by Paenibacillus thiaminolyticus, an anaerobic organism that occurs in the human small intestine
- Aminopyrimidine aminohydrolase, Thinaminase II (EC 3.5.99.2, InterPro: IPR027574, IPR004305)
  - 4-amino-5-aminomethyl-2-methylpyrimidine + H_{2}O <=> 4-amino-5-hydroxymethyl-2-methylpyrimidine + NH_{2}^{+}
  - H_{2}O + thiamine <=> 4-amino-5-hydroxymethyl-2-methylpyrimidine + 5-(2-hydroxyethyl)-4-methylthiazole + H^{+}
  - Produced by a wide range of plants and bacteria. In these organisms, it is mainly responsible for salvage of thiamine pyrimidine from degradation products, rather than the breakdown of thiamine. In bacteria, it stays inside their cells.

== Structure and function ==
=== Thiaminase I ===
Thiaminase I works to cleave the pyrimidine ring in thiamin from the thiazolium ring at the methylene bridge. From there it adds a base compound to the pyrimidine, creating an analogue inhibitor of thiamin. Thiaminase I has the ability to use a multitude of C-N cleaving nucleophilic substrates like cysteine, pyridine, aniline, veratrylamine, dithiothreitol, and quinoline.

When analyzing the structure of Thiaminase I it shows a fold similar to that of group II periplasmic binding proteins like maltose-binding protein. These periplasmic binding proteins have two domains that each contain an α/β fold. These two domains come together to form a deep cleft that are connected by three crossover segments. Due to this structure scientists proposed that Thiaminase I could have evolved from prehistoric periplasmic binding protein that had been responsible for up taking thiamin. Between the two domains, in the cleft, sit the active site for Thiaminase I. Along the cleft there are four acidic residues and six tyrosine residues. In order for Thiamin to interact with Thiaminase I it is positioned in the active site between the pyrimidine and Asp272 by two hydrogen bonds. The Glu241 the goes on to activate the Cys113 to attack C6 of the pyrimidine. This forms a zwitterionic intermediate. The Glu241 causes and protonation and nucleophilic attack that results in the split of the bond between the pyrimidine and the thiazole. When observing the crystalline structure, it has two α/β-type domains separated by a large cleft. At room temperature the two molecules have a noncrystallographic twofold axis that are bridged by a sulfate ion.

=== Thiaminase II ===
Thiaminase II cleaves but does not add a base compound. Thiaminase II can only use water as the nucleophile.

Thiaminase II has been found to be TenA. In order to cleave the C-N bond between the thiazole and pyrimidine Thiaminase only uses water as its nucleophile. When viewing Thiaminase II it is found to have a crystal structure that has 11 helices surrounding a deep acidic pocket. For each monomer present in the quaternary structure it interacts with two other monomers. There are several residues like Tyr112, Phe208, Tyr47, and Tyr163 that have some sort of contribution to the π- stacking environment surrounding the HMP ligand. The Glu205 side chain will form a hydrogen bond with the N1 nitrogen in the pyrimidine ring. Next the Tyr163 and the Asp44 side chain come together to form the hydrogen bonds with the N3 and N4'. Finally the Cys135 catalytic residue is positioned near the C2 in the pyridine ring to complete the split of thiamin into its heterocycles.

=== Anti-thiaminase ===
Antibodies to thiaminase are used to detect the enzyme in research or diagnostics or can arise unwelcome during a treatment of diseases such as cancer. Anti-thiaminase occasionally is used to refer to thiaminase (i.e. an enzyme that acts anti to thiamin).

== Sources ==
This enzyme can be found in a variety of different sources. It can be found in marine organisms, plants, and bacteria. Since thiamine (vitamin B_{1}) is a very important substance required for metabolic pathways by almost all organisms, it can be very detrimental to introduce Thiaminase to a system. Frequently an organism gains this enzyme by ingesting another organism that carries it. In most cases, prey fish will contain one of the bacteria that produces this enzyme. When that prey fish is consumed raw without treatment the bacteria will transfer to the consumer. The consumer eventually will fall ill, even die, from a thiamine deficiency. This has been seen in different lab studies. Through these studies the enzyme has been found in zebra fish as well as red cornet fish. Cooking thiaminase-containing foods usually inactivates the enzyme.

Sources of thiaminase I include:

- Plants: bracken (brake), nardoo, horsetail.
- Fish including zebra fish, carp and goldfish.
- Bacteria such as Paenibacillus thiaminolyticus (formerly in Bacillus), Clostridium sporogenes, C. botulinum.
- An African silk worm, Anaphe venata; this enzyme is more heat-tolerant than other thiaminases and requires a longer cooking time

Sources of thiaminase II include:

- Bacillus aneurinolyticus and Bacillus subtilis.

== Effects ==
=== Function ===
It is still unclear what thiaminase does for fish, bacterial cell or insects that contain it. In ferns, thiaminase I is thought to offer protection from insects

Studies have shown that thiamine hydrolase (thiaminase II), which was originally thought to be involved solely in the degradation of thiamine, has actually been identified as having a role in thiamine degradation with the salvage of the pyrimidine moiety. Thiamin hydrolysis product N-formyl-4-amino-5-aminomethyl-2-methylpyrimidine is transported into the cell and deformylated by the amidohydrolase ylmB and hydrolyzed to 5-aminoimidazole ribotide.

=== When ingested ===
It was described in 1941 as the cause of highly mortal ataxic neuropathy in farmed foxes fed with raw carp.

It is also known as the cause of cerebrocortical necrosis of cattle and polioencephalomalasia of sheep eating thiaminase containing plants.

It was once causing economical losses in raising fisheries, e.g. in yellowtail fed raw anchovy as a sole feed for a certain period, and also in sea bream and rainbow trout. The same problem is being studied in a natural food chain system.

The larvae of a wild silk worm Anaphe venata are being consumed in a rain forest district of Nigeria as a supplemental protein nutrition, and the heat-resistant thiaminase in it is causing an acute seasonal cerebellar ataxia named African seasonal ataxia or Nigerian seasonal ataxia.

In 1860–61, Burke and Wills were the first Europeans to cross Australia south to north; on their return they subsisted primarily on raw nardoo-fern. It is possible that this led to their death due to the extremely high levels of thiaminase contained in nardoo. The Aborigines prepared nardoo by soaking the sporocarps in water for at least a day to avoid the effects of thiamine deficiency that would result from ingesting the leaves raw. In the explorers' journals they noted many symptoms of thiamine deficiency, so it is thought that they did not soak the nardoo long enough. Eventually thiamine deficiency could have led to their demise. It is noteworthy to mention that there are several other hypotheses regarding what may have killed Burke and Wills and it is widely disagreed upon by historians and scientists alike.
