= Heavy-headedness =

Sensation related to dizziness

Heavy-headedness is the feeling of faintness, dizziness, or feeling of floating, wooziness. Individuals may feel as though their head is heavy; also feel as though the room is moving/spinning also known as vertigo. Some causes of heavy-headedness can be tough to get rid of and can last a long period of time, however most can be treated.

== Causes ==
Heavy-headedness can be caused by inner ear disturbance, motion sickness and medication effects. Sometimes it can be caused by an underlying health condition, such as poor circulation, infections or injuries. Panic attacks can cause heavy-headedness as well. Medical conditions like anxiety causes heavy-headedness too. A sinus infection can cause facial pressure and pain, as well as nasal congestion and headaches, which are also known as heavy-headedness. New users to specific drugs can cause heavy-headedness. Chronic subjective dizziness (CSD) can be related to heavy-headedness. Nausea and vomiting can cause heavy-headedness. In cases of Wernicke–Korsakoff syndrome cognitive effects such as severely disrupted speech, giddiness, and heavy-headedness have been documented.

== Treatment ==
Treatment for heavy-headedness depends on the problem. Over-the-counter pain medications can sometimes work for heavy-headedness. Examples include acetaminophen, ibuprofen, and naproxen.

== See also ==
- Dizziness
- Vertigo
