= Korsakoff syndrome =

Mental illness caused by a lack of thiamine in the brain

- Other names: Alcoholic Korsakoff syndrome (AKS), Korsakov syndrome, Alcohol amnestic disorder
- Thiamine
- Specialty: Psychiatry

Korsakoff syndrome (KS) is a disorder of the central nervous system characterized by amnesia, deficits in explicit memory, and confabulation. This neurological disorder is caused by a deficiency of thiamine (vitamin B_{1}) in the brain, and it is typically associated with and exacerbated by the prolonged, excessive ingestion of alcohol. Korsakoff syndrome is often accompanied by Wernicke encephalopathy; this combination is called Wernicke–Korsakoff syndrome.

Korsakoff syndrome is named after Sergei Korsakoff, the Russian neuropsychiatrist who described it during the late 19th century.

== Signs and symptoms ==
There are seven major symptoms of Korsakoff syndrome, an amnestic-confabulatory syndrome:

- anterograde amnesia, memory loss for events after the onset of the syndrome
- retrograde amnesia, memory loss extends back for some time before the onset of the syndrome
- amnesia of fixation, also known as fixation amnesia (loss of immediate memory, a person being unable to remember events of the past few minutes)
- confabulation, that is, invented memories which are then taken as true, due to gaps in memory, with such gaps sometimes associated with blackouts
- minimal content in conversation
- lack of insight
- apathy – interest in things is quickly lost, and there is an indifference to change

Benon R. and LeHuché R. (1920) described the characteristic signs of Korsakoff syndrome with some additional features including: confabulation (false memories), fixation amnesia, paragnosia or false recognition of places, mental excitation, and euphoria.

Thiamine is essential for the decarboxylation of pyruvate, and deficiency during this metabolic process is thought to cause damage to the medial thalamus and mammillary bodies of the posterior hypothalamus, as well as generalized cerebral atrophy. These brain regions are all parts of the limbic system, which is heavily involved in emotion and memory.

KS involves neuronal loss, that is, damage to neurons; gliosis, which is a result of damage to supporting cells of the central nervous system, and bleeding also occurs in mammillary bodies. Damage to the medial dorsal nucleus or anterior nuclei of the thalamus (limbic-specific nuclei) is also associated with this disorder. Cortical dysfunction may have arisen from thiamine deficiency, alcohol neurotoxicity, or structural damage in the diencephalon.

Originally, it was thought that a lack of initiative and a flat affect were important characteristics of emotional presentation in those affected. Studies have questioned this, proposing that neither is necessarily a symptom of KS. Research suggesting that people with Korsakoff syndrome are emotionally unimpaired has made this a controversial topic. It can be argued that apathy, which is a usual characteristic, reflects a deficit of emotional expressions, without affecting the experience or perception of emotion.

KS causes deficits in declarative memory in most people, but leaves implicit spatial, verbal, and procedural memory functioning intact. People with KS have deficits in the processing of contextual information. Context memories refers to the where and when of experiences, and is an essential part of recollection. The ability to store and retrieve this information, such as spatial location or temporal order information, is impaired. Research has also suggested that people with Korsakoff syndrome have impaired executive functions, which can lead to behavioral problems and interfere with daily activities. It is unclear, however, which executive functions are affected most. Nonetheless, IQ is usually not affected by the brain damage associated with Korsakoff's syndrome.

At first it was thought that those with KS used confabulation to fill in memory gaps. However, it has been found that confabulation and amnesia do not necessarily co-occur. Studies have shown that there is dissociation between provoked confabulation, spontaneous confabulation (which is unprovoked), and false memories. That is, people affected could be led to believe certain things had happened which actually had not, but so could people without Korsakoff syndrome.

== Causes ==
Conditions resulting in thiamine deficiency and its effects include chronic alcoholism and severe malnutrition. Alcoholism may co-occur with poor nutrition, which in addition to inflammation of the stomach lining, causes thiamine deficiency. Other causes include dietary deficiencies, prolonged vomiting, eating disorders, and the effects of chemotherapy. It can also occur in pregnant women who have a form of extreme morning sickness known as hyperemesis gravidarum. Mercury poisoning can also lead to Korsakoff syndrome. Though it does not always co-occur, this disorder can emerge frequently as a consequential result of Wernicke's encephalopathy.

PET scans show that there is a decrease of glucose metabolism in the frontal, parietal and cingulated regions of the brain in those with Korsakoff syndrome. This may contribute to memory loss and amnesia. Structural neuroimaging has also shown the presence of midline diencephalic lesions and cortical atrophy.

Structural lesions of the central nervous system, though rare, can also contribute to symptoms of KS. Severe damage to the medial dorsal nucleus inevitably results in memory deficit. Additionally, autopsies of people who had KS have shown lesions in both the midline and anterior thalamus, and thalamic infarctions. Bilateral infarctions to the thalamus can result in Korsakoff-induced amnesia as well. These findings imply damage to anterior thalamic nuclei can result in disruptive memory.

== Risk factors ==
A number of factors may increase a person's risk to develop Korsakoff syndrome. These factors are often related to general health and diet.

- Age
- Alcoholism
- Chemotherapy
- Dialysis
- Extreme dieting
- Genetic factors

== Diagnosis ==
KS is primarily a clinical diagnosis; imaging and lab tests are not necessary.

== Prevention ==
The most effective method of preventing AKS is to avoid thiamine deficiency. In Western nations, the most common causes of such a deficiency are alcoholism and eating disorders. Because these are behavioral-induced causes, Korsakoff syndrome is essentially considered a preventable disease. Thus, fortifying foods with thiamine, or requiring companies that sell alcoholic beverages to supplement them with B vitamins in general or thiamine in particular, could avert many cases.

== Treatment ==
It was once assumed that anyone with KS would eventually need full-time care. This is still often the case, but rehabilitation can help regain some, albeit often limited, level of independence. Treatment involves the replacement or supplementation of thiamine by intravenous or intramuscular injection, together with proper nutrition and hydration. However, the amnesia and brain damage caused by the disease does not always respond to thiamine replacement therapy. In some cases, drug therapy is recommended. Treatment typically requires taking thiamine orally for 3 to 12 months, though only about 20 percent of cases are reversible. If treatment is successful, improvement will become apparent within two years, although recovery is slow and often incomplete.

As an immediate form of treatment, a pairing of intravenous or intramuscular thiamine with a high concentration of B-complex vitamins can be administered three times daily for 2–3 days. In most cases, an effective response will be observed. A single dose of 1 gram of thiamine can also be administered to achieve a clinical response. In those who are seriously malnourished, the sudden availability of glucose without proper bodily levels of thiamine to metabolize is thought to cause damage to cells. Thus, the administration of thiamine along with an intravenous form of glucose is often good practice.

Treatment for the memory aspect of KS can also include domain-specific learning, which when used for rehabilitation is called the method of vanishing cues. Such treatments aim to use intact memory processes as the basis for rehabilitation. Those who used the method of vanishing cues in therapy were found to learn and retain information more easily.

People diagnosed with KS are reported to have a normal life expectancy, presuming that they abstain from alcohol and follow a balanced diet. Empirical research has suggested that good health practices have beneficial effects in Korsakoff syndrome.

== Epidemiology ==
Rates vary between countries, but it is estimated to affect around 12.5% of heavy drinkers.
