= Heinrich Botho Scheube =

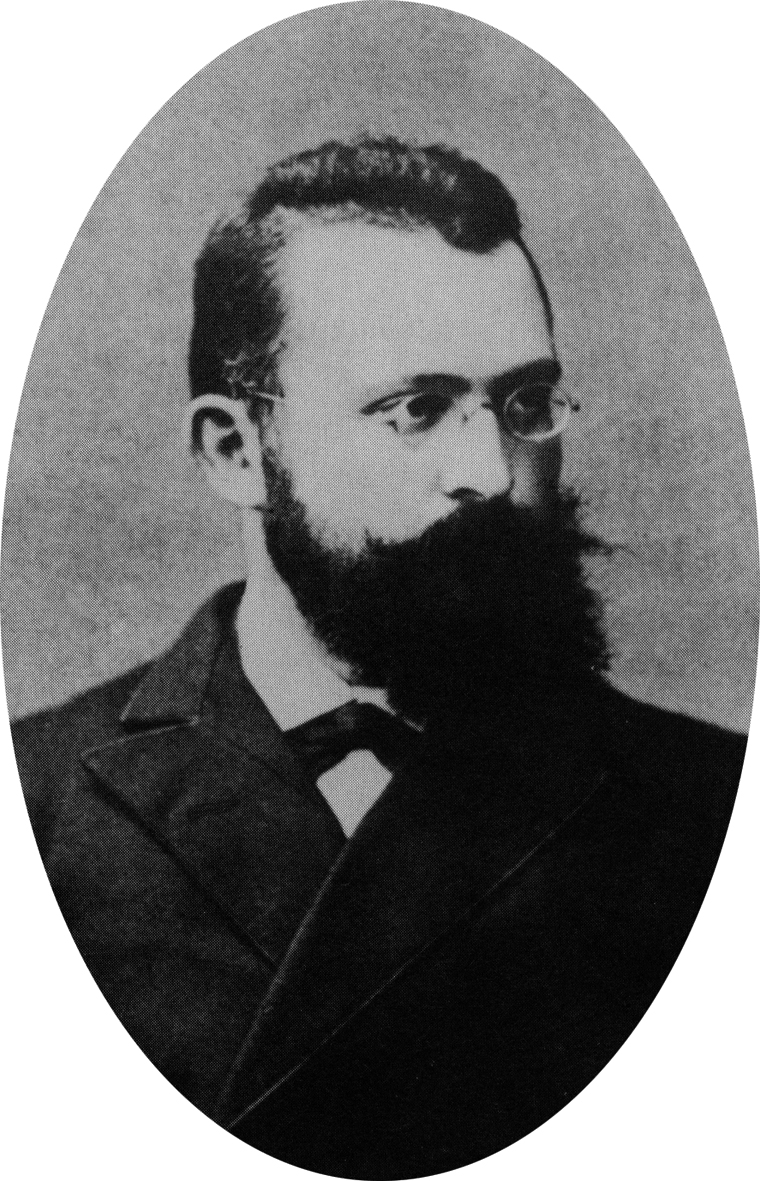
Heinrich Botho Scheube (1853-1923)

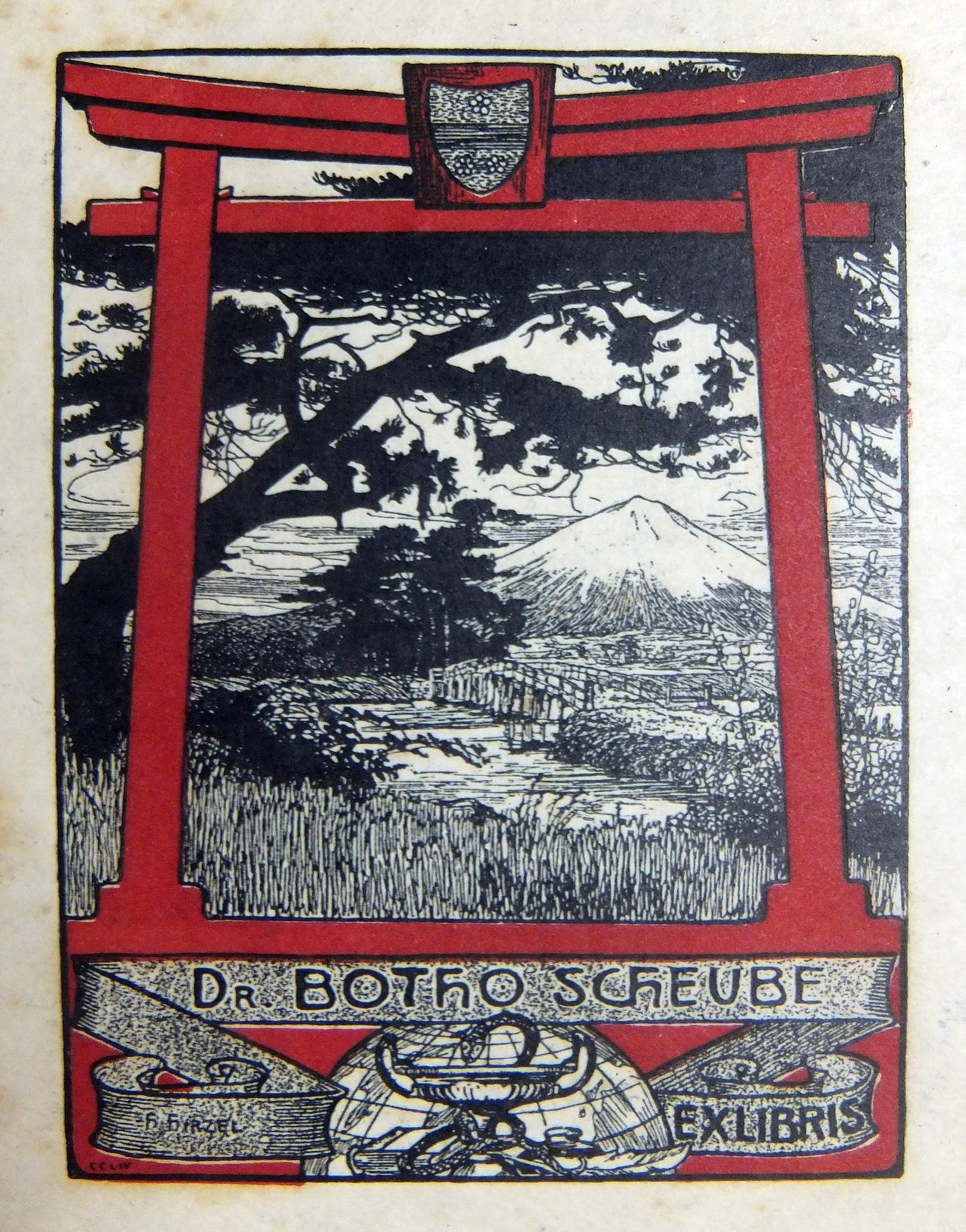
Scheube's bookplate (Exlibris)

Heinrich Botho Scheube (August 18, 1853 – 4 March 1923) was a German physician born in Zeitz.

In 1876 he earned his doctorate from the University of Leipzig, and following graduation remained in Leipzig as an assistant in Carl Wunderlich's clinic for internal medicine. From 1877 to 1881 he taught classes at the medical school in Kyoto and was director at a government hospital. Prior to his return to Germany, he visited China, Siam, Java and Ceylon. In 1885 he received his habilitation at Leipzig, and subsequently practiced medicine in Greiz, a town in eastern Thuringia.

Scheube is largely known for his investigations of beriberi. He also studied diseases prevalent in the tropics, and contributed a number of articles in the field of tropical medicine to Eulenburg's Realencyklopädia. While in Japan he conducted research of Ainu culture and customs.

== Selected publications ==
- Die Ainos (The Ainu), 1881
- Klinische Propädeutik (Clinical propaedeutics), 1884
- Weitere Beiträge zur pathologischen Anatomie und Histologie der Beriberi (Additional contributions to the pathological anatomy and histology of beriberi), 1884
- Klinische Beobachtungen über die Krankheiten Japans (Clinical observations on diseases of Japan) in Virchows Archiv, 1885
- Die Beriberi-Krankheit (The berberi disease), 1894
- Die Krankheiten der warmen Länder (Diseases of tropical countries), 1896

== Research ==
- Pagel Biographical Dictionary (translated from German)
- Early European Writings on Ainu Culture by Kirsten Refsing
