= Biotin-thiamine-responsive basal ganglia disease =

Medical condition (inherited neurometabolic disease)

Biotin-thiamine-responsive basal ganglia disease (BTBGD)
- Other names: BTRBGD, Biotin-responsive basal ganglia disease (BBGD), Thiamine metabolism dysfunction syndrome 2 (biotin or thiamine-responsive type) (THMD2), Thiamine-responsive encephalopathy, Thiamine transporter-2 deficiency
- Specialty: Neurometabolic disorders, neurology, internal medicine
- Symptoms: Subacute encephalopathy; dystonia; spasticity; seizures; dysphagia; ataxia; dysarthria; etc.
- Usual onset: Childhood (ages 3–10)
- Duration: Lifelong
- Causes: Family history (inherited)
- Risk factors: Febrile illness; stress; trauma
- Diagnostic method: Based on symptoms, family history, brain imaging, genetic testing
- Management: |Prevention of symptoms, avoiding stressors, and routine surveillance
- Medication: Administering biotin and thiamine; symptomatic treatments

Biotin-thiamine-responsive basal ganglia disease (BTBGD) is a rare disease that affects the nervous system, particularly the basal ganglia in the brain. It is a treatable neurometabolic disorder with autosomal recessive inheritance. First described in 1998 and then genetically distinguished in 2005, the disease is characterized by progressive brain damage that, if left untreated, can lead to coma and/or death. Commonly observed in individuals with BTBGD is recurring subacute encephalopathy along with confusion, seizures, and disordered movement (hypokinesia).

BTBGD has several alternate names, including:

- BTRBGD
- Biotin-responsive basal ganglia disease (BBGD)
- Thiamine metabolism dysfunction syndrome 2 (biotin or thiamine-responsive type) (THMD2)
- Thiamine-responsive encephalopathy
- Thiamine transporter-2 deficiency

== Signs and symptoms ==
The onset of signs and symptoms can occur at any age but is most common in childhood between the ages of 3 and 10. Less commonly, it may present in early infancy or adulthood. The neurological symptoms usually present as episodes of increasing severity. A less common exhibition of BTBGD involves persistent symptoms, rather than recurrent episodes. In these cases, fewer symptoms are usually present, with their severity slowly increasing over time.

=== Classic presentation (childhood) ===
Recurrent subacute encephalopathy is the most commonly observed symptom, followed by dystonia, both of which are nearly always present. Additional observed symptoms include spasticity or cogwheel rigidity, seizures, difficulty swallowing (dysphagia), ataxia, slurred speech (dysarthria), ophthalmoplegia, opisthotonus, facial palsy, confusion, hyperreflexia, Babinski responses, and ankle clonus.

=== Early infancy presentation ===
In early infancy, the presentation of BTBGD is considered as Leigh-like syndrome or atypical infantile spasms. It is characterized by acute encephalopathy, vomiting, metabolic acidosis (specifically lactic acidosis), and poor feeding during the first 3 months of life.

=== Late-onset presentation (adulthood) ===
Presentation of late-onset BTBGD is considered a Wernicke-like encephalopathy. It is characterized by ataxia, ophthalmoplegia, double vision (diplopia), rapid and uncontrollable eye movement (nystagmus), status seizures, and droopy eyelid (ptosis). The onset of signs and symptoms for adulthood presentation occurs during or after the second decade of life.

== Causes ==
=== Genetics ===
SLC19A3 gene mutations cause BTBGD. SLC19A3 is a gene on chromosome 2q36.3 that encodes the protein thiamine transporter 2. Thiamine transporter 2 moves thiamine (vitamin B_{1}) into cells, which is essential for nervous system functioning. Mutations of the gene encoding this protein (SLC19A3) are likely to impair the functioning of this protein and inhibit the transportation and absorption of thiamine.

The role of biotin in BTBGD is unclear.

=== Triggers ===
Episodes of symptoms can be triggered by several things:

- Febrile illness
- Stress
- Trauma

== Diagnosis ==
BTBGD can be diagnosed based on brain imaging and confirmed with genetic testing. Additional diagnostic tools include laboratory testing of biological fluids and reviewing autosomal recessive inheritance in the family history.

=== Clinical findings ===
==== Brain magnetic resonance imaging (MRI) ====
The MRI of individuals with BTBGD may reveal lesions on the basal ganglia and central bilateral necrosis in the caudate nucleus and putamen. Vasogenic edema is also characteristic of BTBGD. Additional MRI findings include high T_{2} signal intensity with possible swelling in basal ganglia, and abnormal diffuse involvement of the subcortical white matter, cortical, and infratentorial brain. Involvement in the thalami, brain stem, and cerebellum may also be observed.

==== Molecular genetic testing ====
Molecular genetic tests that can be performed for BTBGD include:

- Sequence analysis of the entire coding region or select exons
- Duplication/deletion analysis
- Targeted variant analysis

=== Differential diagnosis ===
Other disorders that present similar clinical findings include:

- Juvenile Huntington's disease
- Leigh syndrome
- Organic acidemia
- Sepiapterin reductase deficiency
- Sydenham's chorea
- Tyrosine hydroxylase deficiency
- Wernicke encephalopathy
- Wilson's disease

== Screening ==
Family members of individuals with BTBGD may be tested regardless of symptoms. Family members may be affected by the disease, may be asymptomatic carriers of the mutation, or may be completely unaffected. Genetic testing of family members allows for the identification of subtle symptoms, asymptomatic carriers, and increased-risk individuals, which allows for early treatment as needed.

== Treatment ==
Treatment of BTBGD is done to manage specific symptoms and concerns. If left untreated, the disease can be fatal. Treatment may vary by symptom, though it is common to administer thiamine (up to 40 mg/kg/day) and sometimes biotin (5–10 mg/kg/day) orally. This treatment is specifically used to address neurological symptoms and can reverse these symptoms if taken early enough. Biotin and thiamine oral therapy must continue throughout the entirety of the individual's life. Other symptomatic treatments include anti-seizure medication to treat seizures and trihexyphenidyl or L-dopa to treat dystonia. Rehab and therapy are used for developmental and social concerns.

=== Management ===
Management of BTBGD includes prevention of symptoms and routine surveillance. Avoiding stressors is essential in managing BTBGD since stress and trauma can trigger episodes. Fevers are also triggers, so fever control is important. Other triggers that should be avoided include infections and excessive exercise. Routine surveillance should include evaluation of the individual's nervous system, education and development, and any other relevant areas.

== Epidemiology ==
The prevalence of BTBGD is unknown. Of the reported cases, it is predominately observed in individuals from Arab populations.
