= Anaphe venata =

Scientific classification
- Kingdom: Animalia
- Phylum: Arthropoda
- Class: Insecta
- Order: Lepidoptera
- Superfamily: Noctuoidea
- Family: Notodontidae
- Genus: Anaphe
- Species: A. venata

Binomial name
- Anaphe venata Butler, 1878

Synonyms
- Anaphe venata var. nyansae Strand, 1910; Anaphe sericea Karsch, 1895

Species of moth

Anaphe venata is a moth of the family Notodontidae. It was described by Arthur Gardiner Butler in 1878. It lives in Angola, Cameroon, the Central African Republic, the Republic of the Congo, the Democratic Republic of the Congo, Equatorial Guinea, Ghana, Ivory Coast, Nigeria, Tanzania and Togo.

The larvae have been recorded feeding on Triplochiton scleroxylon, Cola verticillata and Cola ballayi.

Eating A. venata larvae (entomophagy) has led to thiamine deficiency (vitamin B1) in people who have used it as a protein source. This is because A. venata larvae have high amounts of thiaminases which break down B1. This type of B1 deficiency has been called "African (Nigerian) Seasonal Ataxia" (ASA), as A. venata larvae are available as food source for about four months within certain parts of Africa. Connection between entomophagy and B1 deficiency was first discovered in 1992 in Western Nigeria by Bola Adamolekun. Outbreaks, which have later on been thought to be due to B1 deficiency, have been described as early as 1958 along with other cases from e.g. 1972.

Thread from this moth is sometimes used to produce Sanyan, a native Yoruba silk cloth.
