= Wernicke encephalopathy =

Medical condition

- Other names: Wernicke's disease
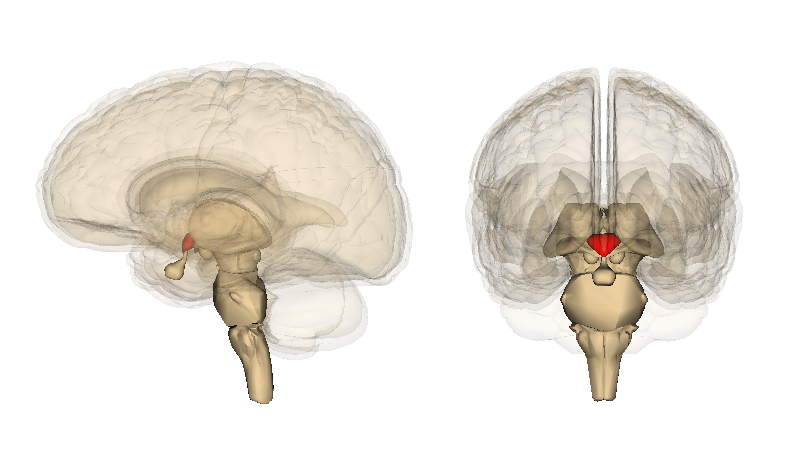
- Hypothalamus
- Specialty: Neurology
- Symptoms: Ataxia, ophthalmoparesis, confusion
- Causes: Thiamine deficiency
- Risk factors: Alcohol use disorder, malnutrition

Wernicke encephalopathy (WE), also Wernicke's encephalopathy, or wet brain is the presence of neurological symptoms caused by biochemical lesions of the central nervous system after exhaustion of B-vitamin reserves, in particular thiamine (vitamin B_{1}). The condition is part of a larger group of thiamine deficiency disorders that includes beriberi, in all its forms, and alcoholic Korsakoff syndrome. When it occurs simultaneously with alcoholic Korsakoff syndrome it is known as Wernicke–Korsakoff syndrome.

Classically, Wernicke encephalopathy is characterised by a triad of symptoms: ophthalmoparesis, ataxia, and confusion. Around 10% of patients exhibit all three features, and other symptoms may also be present. While it is commonly regarded as a condition particular to malnourished people who abuse alcohol, it can be caused by a variety of diseases. It is treated with thiamine supplementation, which can lead to improvement of the symptoms and often complete resolution, particularly in those where alcohol abuse is not the underlying cause. Often other nutrients also need to be replaced, depending on the cause. Medical literature notes how managing the condition in a timely fashion can avoid worsening symptoms.

Wernicke encephalopathy may be present in the general population with a prevalence of around 2%, and is considered underdiagnosed; probably, many cases are in patients who do not have commonly-associated symptoms.

== Signs and symptoms ==
The classic triad of symptoms found in Wernicke encephalopathy is:

- Ophthalmoplegia: later expanded to include other eye movement disorders; typically affecting the lateral rectus muscle. Lateral nystagmus is the most commonly seen disorder, but lateral rectus palsy—usually bilateral—is common, as well.
- Ataxia: later expanded to include imbalance or any cerebellar dysfunction.
- Confusion: later expanded to include any neuropsychological disturbances. Prevalent in roughly eight in 10 diagnosed cases.

Other possible symptoms include:

- Pupillary changes, Retinal haemorrhage, papilledema, and impaired vision and hearing.
- Fatiguability, apathy, irritability, drowsiness, psychological slowing and/or motor slowing.
- Dysphagia, blushing, sleep apnea, epilepsy and stupor.
- Lactic acidosis.
- Memory impairment, amnesia, depression, and psychosis.
- Hypothermia, polyneuropathy, and hyperhidrosis.

Although hypothermia is usually diagnosed with a body temperature of 35 °C (95 °F) or less, incipient cooling caused by deregulation in the central nervous system (CNS) needs to be monitored because it can promote the development of an infection. The patient may report feeling cold, followed by mild chills, cold skin, moderate pallor, tachycardia, hypertension, tremor, or piloerection. External warming techniques are advised to prevent hypothermia.

Among the frequently altered functions is the cardio-circulatory. There may be tachycardia, dyspnea, chest pain, orthostatic hypotension, changes in heart rate and blood pressure. The lack of thiamine sometimes affects other major energy consumers, the myocardium, and also patients may have developed cardiomegaly. Heart failure with lactic acidosis syndrome has been observed. Cardiac abnormalities are an aspect of the WE, which was not included in the traditional approach, and are not classified as a separate disease. Infections have been pointed out as one of the most frequent triggers of death in WE. Furthermore, infections are usually present in pediatric cases.

In the last stage, other symptoms may occur: hyperthermia, increased muscle tone, spastic paralysis, choreic dyskinesias, and coma.

Because of the frequent involvement of the heart, eyes, and peripheral nervous system, several authors prefer to call it Wernicke disease rather than simply encephalopathy.

Early symptoms are nonspecific, and it has been stated that WE may present nonspecific findings. In Wernicke Korsakoff's syndrome some single symptoms are present in about one-third.

=== Location of the lesion ===
Depending on the location of the brain lesion, different symptoms are more frequent:

- Brainstem tegmentum. – Ocular: pupillary changes. Extraocular muscle palsy; gaze palsy: nystagmus.
- Hypothalamus. Medulla: dorsal nuc. of vagus. – Autonomic dysfunction: temperature, cardiocirculatory, respiratory.
- Medulla: vestibular region. Cerebellum. – Ataxia.
- Dorsomedial nuc. of the thalamus. Mammillary bodies. – Amnestic syndrome for recent memory.

Mamillary lesions are characteristic-small petechial hemorrhages.

- Diffuse cerebral dysfunction.- Altered cognition: global confusional state.
- Brainstem: periaqueductal gray.- Reduction of consciousness
- Hypothalamic lesions may also affect the immune system, which is known in people who consume excessive amounts of alcohol, causing dysplasias and infections.

=== Korsakoff syndrome ===
Korsakoff syndrome, characterised by memory impairment, confabulation, confusion, and personality changes, has a strong and recognised link with WE. A very high percentage of patients with Wernicke–Korsakoff syndrome also have peripheral neuropathy, and many people who consume excess alcohol have this neuropathy without other neurologic signs or symptoms. Korsakoff's occurs much more frequently in WE due to chronic alcoholism. It is uncommon among those who do not consume excessive amounts of alcohol. Up to 80% of WE patients who misuse alcohol develop Korsakoff's syndrome. In Korsakoff's, atrophy of the thalamus and the mammillary bodies and frontal lobe involvement is usually observed. In a study, half of Wernicke–Korsakoff cases had good recovery from the amnesic state, which may take from 2 months to 10 years.

== Risk factors ==
Wernicke encephalopathy has classically been thought of as a disease solely of people who drink excessive amounts of alcohol, but it is also found in the chronically undernourished, and in recent years has been discovered post bariatric surgery. Without being exhaustive, the documented causes of Wernicke encephalopathy have included:

- pancreatitis, liver dysfunction, chronic diarrhea, celiac disease, Crohn's disease, uremia, thyrotoxicosis
- vomiting, hyperemesis gravidarum, malabsorption, gastrointestinal surgery or diseases
- incomplete parenteral nutrition, starvation/fasting
- chemotherapy, renal dialysis, diuretic therapy, stem cell/marrow transplantation
- cancer, AIDS, Creutzfeldt–Jakob disease, febrile infections
- this disease may even occur in some people with normal, or even high blood thiamine levels, or people with deficiencies in intracellular transport of this vitamin. Selected genetic mutations, including presence of the X-linked transketolase-like 1 gene, SLC19A2 thiamine transporter protein mutations, and the aldehyde dehydrogenase-2 gene, which may predispose to alcohol use disorder. The APOE epsilon-4 allele, involved in Alzheimer's disease, may increase the chance of developing neurological symptoms.

== Pathophysiology ==
Thiamine deficiency and errors of thiamine metabolism are believed to be the primary cause of Wernicke encephalopathy. Thiamine, also called B_{1}, helps to break down glucose. Specifically, it acts as an essential coenzyme to the TCA cycle and the pentose phosphate shunt. Thiamine is first metabolised to its more active form, thiamine diphosphate (TDP), before it is used. The body only has 2–3 weeks of thiamine reserves, which are readily exhausted without intake, or if depletion occurs rapidly, such as in chronic inflammatory states or in diabetes. Thiamine is involved in:

1. Metabolism of carbohydrates, releasing energy.
2. Production of neurotransmitters including glutamic acid and GABA.
3. Lipid metabolism, necessary for myelin production.
4. Amino acid modification. Probably linked to the production of taurine, of great cardiac importance.

=== Neuropathology ===
The primary neurological-related injury caused by thiamine deficiency in WE is three-fold: oxidative damage, mitochondrial injury leading to apoptosis, and directly stimulating a pro-apoptotic pathway. Thiamine deficiency affects both neurons and astrocytes, glial cells of the brain. Thiamine deficiency alters the glutamate uptake of astrocytes, through changes in the expression of astrocytic glutamate transporters EAAT1 and EAAT2, leading to excitotoxicity. Other changes include those to the GABA transporter subtype GAT-3, GFAP, glutamine synthetase, and the Aquaporin 4 channel. Focal lactic acidosis also causes secondary oedema, oxidative stress, inflammation and white matter damage.

=== Pathological anatomy ===
Cerebellum

Despite its name, WE is not related to Wernicke's area, a region of the brain associated with speech and language interpretation.

Brain lesions in WE are usually credited to focal lactic acidosis. An absence of thiamine can lead to too much pyruvate within the cells since it is not available to help convert pyruvate through the TCA cycle. An increase in pyruvate causes an increase in lactate concentration leading to focal lactic acidosis.

Lesions can be reversed in most cases with immediate supplementation of thiamine.

Lesions are usually symmetrical in the periventricular region, diencephalon, the midbrain, hypothalamus, and cerebellar vermis. Brainstem lesions may include cranial nerve III, IV, VI and VIII nuclei, the medial thalamic nuclei, and the dorsal nucleus of the vagus nerve. Oedema may be found in the regions surrounding the third ventricle, and fourth ventricle, also appearing petechiae and small hemorrhages. Chronic cases can present the atrophy of the mammillary bodies.

In 1949, the idea that WE lesions are a result of a disruption to the blood-brain barrier was introduced. Large proteins passing into the brain can put neurological tissue at risk of toxic effects. The blood-brain barrier junctions are typically found to have WE lesions located at that region of the brain.

An altered blood–brain barrier may cause a perturbed response to certain drugs and foods.

== Diagnosis ==
Diagnosis of Wernicke encephalopathy or disease is made clinically. Caine et al. in 1997 established criteria that Wernicke encephalopathy can be diagnosed in any patient with just two or more of the main symptoms noted above. The sensitivity of the diagnosis by the classic triad was 23% but increased to 85% taking two or more of the four classic features. These criteria are challenged because all the cases he studied were people who drank excessive amounts of alcohol. Some consider it sufficient to suspect the presence of the disease with only one of the principal symptoms. Some British hospital protocols suspect WE with any one of these symptoms: confusion, decreased consciousness level (or unconsciousness, stupor or coma), memory loss, ataxia or unsteadiness, ophthalmoplegia or nystagmus, and unexplained hypotension with hypothermia. The presence of only one sign should be sufficient for treatment.

The sensitivity of magnetic resonance imaging (MR) was 53% and the specificity was 93%. The reversible cytotoxic edema was considered the most characteristic lesion of WE. The location of the lesions were more frequently atypical among people who drank appropriate amounts of alcohol, while typical contrast enhancement in the thalamus and the mammillary bodies was observed frequently associated with alcohol misuse. These abnormalities may include:

- Dorsomedial thalami, periaqueductal gray matter, mamillary bodies, tectal plate and brainstem nuclei are commonly affected. Involvement is always bilateral and symmetric. Value of DWI in the diagnosis of WE is minimal. Axial FLAIR MRI images represent the best diagnostic MRI sequence. Contrast material may highlight involvement of the mamillary bodies.

There appears to be very little value for CT scans.Thiamine can be measured using an erythrocyte transketolase activity assay, or by activation by measurement of in vitro thiamine diphosphate levels. Normal thiamine levels do not necessarily rule out the presence of WE, as this may be a patient with difficulties in intracellular transport.

== Prevention ==
There are hospital protocols for prevention, supplementing with thiamine in the presence of: history of alcohol misuse or related seizures, requirement for IV glucose, signs of malnutrition, poor diet, recent diarrhea or vomiting, peripheral neuropathy, intercurrent illness, delirium tremens or treatment for DTs, and others.

Some experts advise parenteral thiamine should be given to all at-risk patients in the emergency department.

In the clinical diagnosis should be remembered that early symptoms are nonspecific, and it has been stated that WE may present nonspecific findings. There is consensus to provide water-soluble vitamins and minerals after gastric operations.

In some countries certain foods have been supplemented with thiamine, and have reduced WE cases. Improvement is difficult to quantify because they applied several different actions. Avoiding or moderating alcohol consumption and having adequate nutrition reduces one of the main risk factors in developing Wernicke–Korsakoff syndrome..

== Treatment ==
Most symptoms will improve quickly if deficiencies are treated early. Memory disorder may be permanent.

In patients suspected of WE, thiamine treatment should be started immediately. Blood should be immediately taken to test for thiamine, other vitamins and minerals levels. Following this an immediate intravenous or intramuscular dose of thiamine should be administered two or three times daily. Thiamine administration is usually continued until clinical improvement ceases.

Considering the diversity of possible causes and several surprising symptomatologic presentations, and because there is low assumed risk of toxicity of thiamine, because the therapeutic response is often dramatic from the first day, some qualified authors indicate parenteral thiamine if WE is suspected, both as a resource for diagnosis and treatment. The diagnosis is highly supported by the response to parenteral thiamine, but is not sufficient to be excluded by the lack of it. Parenteral thiamine administration is associated with a very small risk of anaphylaxis.

People who consume excessive amounts of alcohol may have poor dietary intakes of several vitamins, and impaired thiamine absorption, metabolism, and storage; they may thus require higher doses. This risk has also been described in older literature in terms of alcohol dependence, although many clinical sources now use the term alcohol use disorder.

If glucose is given, such as in people with an alcohol use disorder who are also hypoglycaemic, thiamine must be given concurrently. If this is not done, the glucose will rapidly consume the remaining thiamine reserves, exacerbating this condition.

The observation of edema in MR, and also the finding of inflation and macrophages in necropsied tissues, has led to successful administration of antiinflammatories.

Other nutritional abnormalities should also be looked for, as they may be exacerbating the disease. In particular, magnesium, a cofactor of transketolase which may induce or aggravate the disease.

Other supplements may also be needed, including: cobalamin, ascorbic acid, folic acid, nicotinamide, zinc, phosphorus (dicalcium phosphate) and in some cases taurine, especially suitable when there cardiocirculatory impairment. Patient-guided nutrition is suggested. In patients with Wernicke–Korsakoff syndrome, even higher doses of parenteral thiamine are recommended. Concurrent toxic effects of alcohol should also be considered.

== Epidemiology ==
There are no conclusive statistical studies, all figures are based on partial studies.

Wernicke's lesions were observed in 0.8 to 2.8% of the general population autopsies, and 12.5% of people with an alcohol use disorder. This figure increases to 35% of such individuals if including cerebellar damage due to lack of thiamine.

Most autopsy cases were from people with an alcohol use disorder. Autopsy series were performed in hospitals on the material available which is unlikely to be representative of the entire population. Considering the slight affectations, previous to the generation of observable lesions at necropsy, the percentage should be higher. There is evidence to indicate that Wernicke encephalopathy is underdiagnosed. For example, in one 1986 study, 80% of cases were diagnosed postmortem. Is estimated that only 5–14% of patients with WE are diagnosed in life.

In a series of autopsy studies held in Recife, Brazil, it was found that only 7 out of 36 had consumed excessive amounts of alcohol, and only a small minority had malnutrition. In a reviewed of 53 published case reports from 2001 to 2011, the relationship with alcohol was also about 20% (10 out of 53 cases).

WE related to alcohol misuse is more common in males and is more common in females when not related to alcohol misuse. In alcohol-related cases, WE patients average the age of 40, and non-alcohol-related cases typically occur in younger people.

== History ==
WE was first identified in 1881 by the German neurologist Carl Wernicke, although the link with thiamine was not identified until the 1930s.

Carl Wernicke discovered the sensory center of speech. Wernicke figured out that Broca's area was not the only center of speech, it was also able to distinguish motor aphasia from sensory aphasia. He also pointed to the possibility of conduction aphasia since he came to understand the arrangement of the brain's extrinsic and intrinsic connections. He demonstrated that the sensory information reached its corresponding area in the cerebral cortex through projection fibers. From there, this information, following the association system, would be distributed to different regions of the cortex, integrating sensory processing.

He reported three patients with WE, including two men (aged 33 and 36) who were alcoholics and one woman (aged 20) who ingested sulfuric acid, leading to pyloric stenosis. All three had ocular motor abnormalities and he performed an autopsy on each, providing a clinical-pathological correlation.

A similar presentation of this disease was described by the Russian psychiatrist Sergei Korsakoff in a series of articles published 1887–1891; where the chronic version of WE was described as Korsakoff's Syndrome, involving symptoms of amnesia.
