= Thiamine responsive megaloblastic anemia syndrome =

- Specialty: Medical genetics
- Complications: Diabetes mellitus, anemia, hearing loss
- Causes: SLC19A2 gene mutation
- Treatment: Thiamine

Thiamine responsive megaloblastic anemia syndrome (also known as Rogers syndrome) is a very rare autosomal recessive genetic disorder affecting a thiamine transporter, which is characterized by megaloblastic anemia, diabetes mellitus, and hearing loss. The condition is treated with high doses of thiamine (vitamin B1).

== Signs and symptoms ==
In most cases (80-99%), people with this condition experience poor appetite (anorexia), diarrhea, headache, and lethargy. Thiamine responsive megaloblastic anemia syndrome is associated with progressive sensorineural hearing loss. Additional manifestations include optic atrophy, short stature, enlarged liver, and an enlarged spleen. Some cases may affect the heart, leading to abnormal heart rhythms.

== Genetics ==
The condition is inherited in an autosomal recessive fashion, and is caused by a mutation in the SLC19A2 gene.

== Treatment ==
Treatment consists of high doses of oral thiamine. Treatment can delay the onset of diabetes mellitus, and reverses anemia. If treatment is initiated early, thiamine deficiency can be prevented.

== History ==
The condition was first described in 1969 by Dr. Lon E. Rogers, a pediatric hematologist in Dallas, Texas.
