= Carl Wernicke =

German physician and neuropathologist (1848–1905)

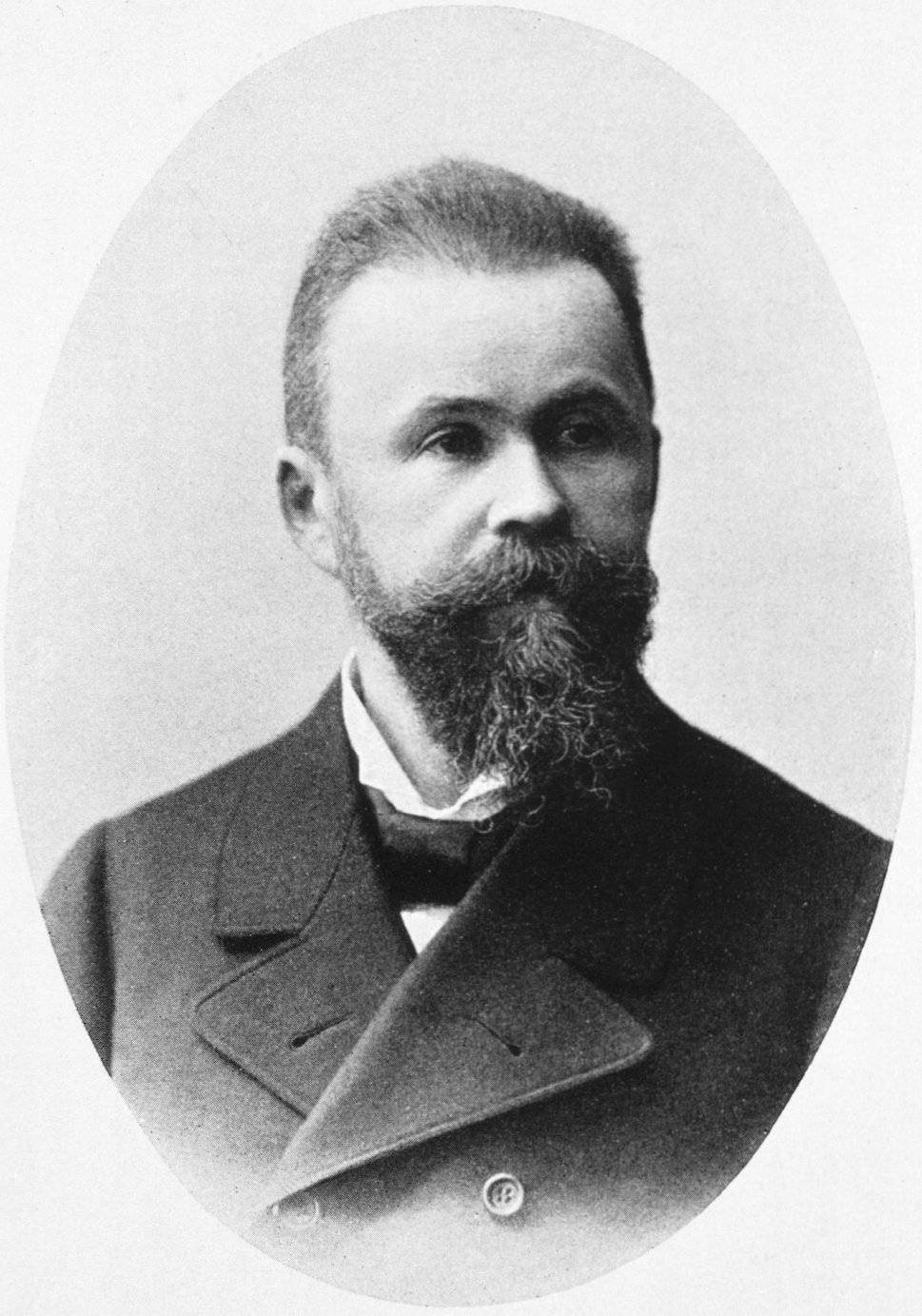
- Born: 15 May 1848; Tarnowitz, Upper Silesia, Kingdom of Prussia
- Died: 15 June 1905 (aged 57); Gräfenroda, German Empire
- Education: University of Breslau
- Known for: Wernicke aphasia Wernicke encephalopathy Wernicke's area Wernicke–Geschwind model Wernicke–Korsakoff syndrome
- Scientific career
- Fields: Psychiatry, neurology
- Workplaces: Charité, University of Breslau, University of Halle

Carl (or Karl) (Note: His first name has long appeared in print in both the Karl and Carl spelling variants (see Charles).) Wernicke (/ˈvɛərnɪkə/; German: [ˈvɛɐ̯nɪkə]; 15 May 1848 – 15 June 1905) was a German physician, anatomist, psychiatrist and neuropathologist. He is known for his influential research into the pathological effects of specific forms of encephalopathy and also the study of receptive aphasia, both of which are commonly associated with Wernicke's name and referred to as Wernicke encephalopathy and Wernicke's aphasia, respectively. His research, along with that of Paul Broca, led to groundbreaking realizations of the localization of brain function, specifically in speech. As such, Wernicke's area (a.k.a. Wernicke's Speech Area) has been named after the scientist.

== Early life, family and education ==
Wernicke was born on May 15, 1848, in Tarnowitz, a small town in Upper Silesia, Prussia, now Tarnowskie Góry, Poland. He obtained his secondary education at the Königliche Gymnasium in Oppeln and the Maria-Magdalenen-Gymnasium in Breslau.

Wernicke studied medicine at the University of Breslau, graduating in 1870. He performed graduate work studying language and aphasia at Breslau, Berlin, and Vienna. He worked in Breslau at Allerheiligen Hospital as an assistant to an ophthalmology professor Ostrid Foerster for six months. Neumann sent him to Vienna for six months to study with neuropathologist Theodor Meynert, who would have a profound influence upon Wernicke's career.

== Career ==
In 1870, the Franco-Prussian War broke out, where Wernicke served as an army surgeon. After serving in the war, he returned to the Allerheiligen Hospital and worked in the psychiatric department as an assistant under Professor Heinrich Neumann.

In 1875, Wernicke was appointed the first assistant in the Charité in Berlin under Karl Westphal, where he stayed until 1878 studying psychiatry and nervous diseases.

In 1878 Wernicke founded a private neuropsychiatric practice in Berlin and published numerous articles until he left the practice in 1881. In 1885, he succeeded his mentor Professor Neumann and served as associate professor of neurology and psychiatry at Breslau, where he also attained a conference chair. By 1890 Wernicke became the director of the psychiatric wing at the Allerheiligen Hospital, and he also became head of the University Hospital's Department of Neurology and Psychiatry. In 1904, Wernicke left that university and worked at the University of Halle, heading its Psychiatry and Neurology Clinic.

== Studies in aphasia ==
Wernicke's area animation

Wernicke was heavily inspired by the research on language and communication coming from Paris, France, specifically from Paul Pierre Broca. Broca's work on motor aphasia influenced Wernicke's interests in psychophysiology and aphasiology relating to language. Wernicke began to question the relationship between dysphasia and the location of lesions that caused brain damage resulting in language problems.

While studying with Meynert in 1874, Wernicke published Der Aphasische Symptomencomplex. In his book, Wernicke described sensory aphasia, which is now known as Wernicke's aphasia, as being distinctly different from motor aphasia, described by Broca. He categorized sensory aphasia as fluent but disordered speech, impaired understanding of speech, and impaired silent reading. Incorporating Broca's findings on motor aphasia, Wernicke described both forms of aphasia as being results of brain damage. However, the location of damage determined which aphasia a patient developed. He described sensory aphasia as a result from lesions to the left temporal lobe and motor / Broca's aphasia as a result from lesions to the left posterior frontal lobe. These two concepts were the foundation for his theory on the neural bases of language.

Wernicke hypothesized that motor activity was accompanied by sensory stimulation and that there were fibers connected the motor and sensory cortexes in the brain, so there must also be a connection between the lesioned areas contributing to sensory and motor aphasia. He discussed the problems with severing this connection, assuming both structures remain intact. The area affecting sensory aphasia would still function, so a patient could hypothetically retain comprehension of oral speech and silent reading. However, the connection to Broca's area would be broken, causing prevention of effective translation of mental processes into verbal speech.

Wernicke additionally discussed the dangers of mistaking sensory aphasia with a confused or psychotic state, and he emphasized the importance of distinguishing between aphasia and agnosia, the failure to recognize objects, which was described by Sigmund Freud in 1891.

Wernicke proposed a theory of localization and suggested that different identifiable regions of the brain control different behaviors and these areas interact to produce more behaviors. This is the case with Broca's and Wernicke's areas interacting to produce language. Broca and Wernicke's work paved the way for others to study and identify localized areas of the brain, including the identification of the motor homunculus as well as the theory that brain damage in specific areas is responsible for different disorders, diseases, and abnormal behaviors.

Ludwig Lichtheim, a professor of medicine at Bern University Hospital, wrote his work "Über Aphasie," which was influenced by Broca, Wernicke and Adolf Kussmaul. Lichtheim's work analyzed language abilities and categorized language disorders into seven different aphasias, Wernicke's aphasia being one of them. Wernicke then adopted Lichtheim's aphasia classification and became the Wernicke-Lichtheim model.

== Theory of elementary symptom ==
At the 59th Breslau conference in 1892, Karl Kahlbaum described paranoia based on a case study that Wernicke was familiar with. Wernicke described the case study as an example of what he called the "elementary symptom," which is the notion that there is a single, fundamental symptom and all other symptoms are derived from the elementary symptom.

Karl Leonhard also followed Wernicke's studies. Although Leonhard rejected the "elementary symptom" theory because it overgeneralizes symptoms of disorders, he did incorporate Wernicke's psychopathological categories of disorders into Emil Kraepelin's binary system of classification. For example, Leonhard renamed Wernicke's "anxiety-psychosis" as "cycloid psychosis," which does resemble schizophrenia and Bipolar cycling. Kraepelin also rejected the elementary symptom theory by describing all of the clinical aspects of a particular disorder (nosology) in contrast to Wernicke's theory, which attempted to home in on the key symptom instead of looking at each disorder as a whole.

The theory of elementary symptom was generally rejected and is not a well-known concept today because of the lack of supporting evidence for the theory. Although the theory itself is not supported in modern nosology and etiology, it does have a general influence in psychopharmacology practices with its notion of a target symptom. Clinical psychopharmacology typically treats particular symptoms instead of disorders and diagnoses as a whole. Modern psychiatry does rest on assumptions that some symptoms result from other symptoms, parallel to Wernicke's theory.

Wernicke himself did not pursue research on the elementary symptom theory because of his devotion to aphasiology. One of the fundamental problems with the elementary symptom theory is that Wernicke described anxiety as the elementary symptom of many disorders. This was problematic for the theory because anxiety, to some extent, is seen in almost all psychiatric disorders. This caused the elementary symptom to fail at categorizing clinical descriptions and proper treatments. Another difficulty for Wernicke and other psychologists was determining which symptom was the elementary symptom and given priority over other symptoms that might be just as important to treat and might not be a direct result of another symptom. Lastly, Wernicke preserved traditional German psychiatry and described clinical vignettes, being unable to distinguish between physical and psychological causes of symptoms instead of using Kraepelin's approach of delineation of syndromes and disorders.

== Eponyms ==
- Wernicke's aphasia: The eponymous term for receptive or sensory aphasia. It is the inability to understand speech, or to produce meaningful speech, caused by lesions to the posterior superior temporal gyrus.
- Wernicke's area / Wernicke's centre: in the left superior temporal gyrus of the human brain, where phonological processing is associated; the area affected that results in Wernicke's aphasia.
- Wernicke encephalopathy: An acute neurological dysfunction caused by a thiamine deficiency. It is characterized by the triad of ophthalmoparesis, ataxia and mental confusion. When combined with Korsakoff psychosis, a subacute dementia syndrome, it is then called Wernicke–Korsakoff syndrome.
- Wernicke's pupillary reaction: The absence of direct reaction to light in the blind part of the retina. First described by ophthalmologist Hermann Wilbrand in 1881.
- Wernicke's cramp
- Wernicke's dementia
- Wernicke's disease
- Wernicke-Mann hemiplegia / Wernicke-Mann's position

== Publications ==
In 1897, with Theodor Ziehen (1862-1950), he founded the journal Monatsschrift für Psychiatrie und Neurologie.

Conference proceedings from Breslau were published in the Allgemeine Zeitschrift fur Psychiatrie und Psychische-Gerichtliche Medizin.

Principal written works by Wernicke include:

- Der aphasische Symptomencomplex. Eine psychologische Studie auf anatomischer Basis [The aphasic symptom complex: a psychological study from an anatomical basis] (in German). Breslau: M. Crohn und Weigert. 1874.
- Das Urwindungssystem des menschlichen Gehirns [The Primordial Gyral-System of the Human Brain], 1876.
- Lehrbuch der Gehirnkrankheiten : für Aerzte und Studirende [Textbook of brain diseases: for doctors and students] (in German). 1881.
- "Über hemiopische Pupillenreaktion" [On hemianopsic pupillary response]. Fortschritte der Medicin (in German). 1: 49–53. 1883.
- Grundriss der Psychiatrie in klinischen Vorlesungen [Foundation of psychiatry in clinical lectures] (in German). 1894.
- Atlas des Gehirns; Schnitte durch das menschliche Gehirn in photographischen Originalen [Atlas of the brain; sections of the human brain from photographic originals], 1897.
- Krankenvorstellungen aus der psychiatrischen klinik in Breslau [Ideas on illness from the psychiatric clinic in Breslau], 1899.

Anthologies

- Eggert, Gertrude H. (1977). Wernicke's works on aphasia: A sourcebook and review. Mouton. ISBN 9789027979858.

== Personal life and demise ==
Wernicke died on June 15, 1905, due to injuries suffered from a bicycle accident in the Thuringian Forest.
