= Confabulation =

Recall of fabricated, misinterpreted or distorted memories

Confabulation is a memory error consisting of the production of fabricated, distorted, or misinterpreted memories about oneself or the world. It is generally associated with certain types of brain damage (especially aneurysm in the anterior communicating artery) or a specific subset of dementias. While still an area of ongoing research, the basal forebrain is implicated in the phenomenon of confabulation. People who confabulate present with incorrect memories ranging from subtle inaccuracies to surreal fabrications, and may include confusion or distortion in the temporal framing (timing, sequence or duration) of memories. In general, they are very confident about their recollections, even when challenged with contradictory evidence.

Confabulation occurs when individuals mistakenly recall false information, without intending to deceive. Brain damage, dementia, and anticholinergic toxidrome can cause this distortion. Two types of confabulation exist: provoked and spontaneous, with two distinctions: verbal and behavioral. Verbal statements, false information, and the patient's unawareness of the distortion are all associated with this phenomenon. Personality structure also plays a role in confabulation.

Numerous theories have been developed to explain confabulation. Neuropsychological theories suggest that cognitive dysfunction causes the distortion. Self-identity theories posit that people confabulate to preserve themselves. The temporality theory believes that confabulation occurs when an individual cannot place events properly in time. The monitoring and strategic retrieval account theories argue that confabulation arises when individuals cannot recall memories correctly or monitor them after retrieval. The executive control and fuzzy-trace theories also attempt to explain why confabulation happens.

Confabulation can occur with nervous system injuries or illnesses, including Korsakoff's syndrome, Alzheimer's disease, schizophrenia, and traumatic brain injury, and personality disorders such as borderline personality. It is believed that the right frontal lobe of the brain is damaged, causing false memories. Children are especially susceptible to forced confabulation as they are highly impressionable. Feedback can increase confidence in false memories. In rare cases, confabulation occurs in ordinary individuals.

Different memory tests, including recognition tasks and free recall tasks, can be used to study confabulation. Treatment depends on the underlying cause of the distortion. Ongoing research aims to develop a standard test battery to discern between different types of confabulations, distinguish delusions from confabulations, understand the role of unconscious processes, and identify pathological and nonpathological confabulations.

== Description ==
Confabulation was originally defined as "the emergence of memories of events and experiences which never took place".

Confabulation is distinguished from lying as there is no intent to deceive and the person is unaware the information is false. Although individuals can present blatantly false information, confabulation can also seem to be coherent, internally consistent, and relatively normal.

Most known cases of confabulation are symptomatic of brain damage or dementias, such as aneurysm, Alzheimer's disease, or Wernicke–Korsakoff syndrome (a common manifestation of thiamine deficiency caused by alcohol use disorder). Additionally confabulation often occurs in people with anticholinergic toxidrome when interrogated about bizarre or irrational behaviour.

Confabulated memories of all types most often occur in autobiographical memory and are indicative of a complicated and intricate process that can be led astray at any point during encoding, storage, or recall of a memory. This type of confabulation is commonly seen in Korsakoff's syndrome.

=== Distinctions ===
Several forms of confabulation have been distinguished which vary in terms of behaviour, mechanism, and location of brain damage. The most common distinction is between the following two types:

- Provoked confabulations represent a normal response to a faulty memory, are common in both amnesia and dementia, and can become apparent during memory tests.
- Spontaneous confabulations do not occur in response to a cue and seem to be involuntary. They are relatively rare, more common in cases of dementia, and may result from the interaction between frontal lobe pathology and organic amnesia. A subgroup of patients at least occasionally act according to their confabulations betraying a confusion of current reality. These patients are always disoriented about their current role, location, and time. This form has been called behaviorally spontaneous confabulation. It is strongly associated with damage, disconnection, or dysfunction of the posterior medial orbitofrontal cortex (area 13) and appears to have a specific mechanism: a failure of "orbitofrontal reality filtering", a preconscious mechanism normally verifying whether an upcoming thought refers to current reality or not.

== Signs and symptoms ==
Confabulation is associated with several characteristics:

1. False verbal statements that may include autobiographical and non-personal information, such as historical facts, fairy-tales, or other aspects of semantic memory.
2. The account is normally coherent and is usually drawn from the patient's memory of actual experiences. Very rarely, it is fantastic.
3. Both the premise and the details of the account can be false.
4. The patient is unaware of the accounts' distortions or inappropriateness, and is not concerned when errors are pointed out.
5. There is no hidden motivation behind the account.
6. The patient's personality structure may play a role in their readiness to confabulate.

== Theories ==
Theories of confabulation range in emphasis. Some theories propose that confabulations represent a way for memory-disabled people to maintain their self-identity. Other theories use neurocognitive links to explain the process of confabulation. Still other theories frame confabulation around the more familiar concept of delusion. Other researchers frame confabulation within the fuzzy-trace theory. Finally, some researchers call for theories that rely less on neurocognitive explanations and more on epistemic accounts.

=== Neuropsychological theories ===
The most popular theories of confabulation come from the field of neuropsychology or cognitive neuroscience. Controlled experimental evidence is, however, scarce. Research suggests that confabulation is associated with dysfunction of cognitive processes that control the retrieval from long-term memory. Frontal lobe damage often disrupts this process, preventing the retrieval of information and the evaluation of its output. Furthermore, researchers argue that confabulation is a disorder resulting from failed "reality monitoring/source monitoring" (i.e. deciding whether a memory is based on an actual event or whether it is imagined). Some neuropsychologists suggest that errors in retrieval of information from long-term memory that are made by normal subjects involve different components of control processes than errors made by confabulators. Fantastic confabulations have been attributed to a dysfunction of the Supervisory System, which is believed to be a function of the frontal cortex.

=== Temporality theory ===
Support for the temporality account suggests that confabulations occur when an individual is unable to place events properly in time. Thus, an individual might correctly state an action they performed, but say they did it yesterday, when they did it weeks ago. In the Memory, Consciousness, and Temporality Theory, confabulation occurs because of a deficit in temporal consciousness or awareness.

=== Monitoring theory ===
Along a similar notion are the theories of reality and source monitoring theories. In these theories, confabulation occurs when individuals incorrectly attribute memories as reality, or incorrectly attribute memories to a certain source. Thus, an individual might claim an imagined event happened in reality, or that a friend told him/her about an event he/she actually heard about on television.

=== Strategic retrieval account theory ===
Supporters of the strategic retrieval account suggest that confabulations occur when an individual cannot actively monitor a memory for truthfulness after its retrieval. An individual recalls a memory, but there is some deficit after recall that interferes with the person establishing its falseness.

=== Executive control theory ===
Still others propose that all types of false memories, including confabulation, fit into a general memory and executive function model. In 2007, a framework for confabulation was proposed that stated confabulation is the result of two things: Problems with executive control and problems with evaluation. In the executive control deficit, the incorrect memory is retrieved from the brain. In the evaluative deficit, the memory will be accepted as a truth due to an inability to distinguish a belief from an actual memory.

=== In the context of delusion theories ===
Recent models of confabulation have attempted to build upon the link between delusion and confabulation. More recently, a monitoring account for delusion, applied to confabulation, proposed both the inclusion of conscious and unconscious processing. The claim was that by encompassing the notion of both processes, spontaneous versus provoked confabulations could be better explained. In other words, there are two ways to confabulate. One is the unconscious, spontaneous way in which a memory goes through no logical, explanatory processing. The other is the conscious, provoked way in which a memory is recalled intentionally by the individual to explain something confusing or unusual.

=== Fuzzy-trace theory ===
Fuzzy-trace theory, or FTT, is a concept more commonly applied to the explanation of judgement decisions. According to this theory, memories are encoded generally (gist), as well as specifically (verbatim). Thus, a confabulation could result from recalling the incorrect verbatim memory or from being able to recall the gist portion, but not the verbatim portion, of a memory.

FTT uses a set of five principles to explain false-memory phenomena. Principle 1 suggests that subjects store verbatim information and gist information parallel to one another. Both forms of storage involve the surface content of an experience. Principle 2 shares factors of retrieval of gist and verbatim traces. Principle 3 is based on dual-opponent processes in false memory. Generally, gist retrieval supports false memory, while verbatim retrieval suppresses it. Developmental variability is the topic of Principle 4. As a child develops into an adult, there is obvious improvement in the acquisition, retention, and retrieval of both verbatim and gist memory. However, during late adulthood, there will be a decline in these abilities. Finally, Principle 5 explains that verbatim and gist processing cause vivid remembering. Fuzzy-trace Theory, governed by these 5 principles, has proved useful in explaining false memory and generating new predictions about it.

=== Epistemic theory ===
However, not all accounts are so embedded in the neurocognitive aspects of confabulation. Some attribute confabulation to epistemic accounts. In 2009, theories underlying the causation and mechanisms for confabulation were criticized for their focus on neural processes, which are somewhat unclear, as well as their emphasis on the negativity of false remembering. Researchers proposed that an epistemic account of confabulation would be more encompassing of both the advantages and disadvantages of the process.

== Presentation ==
=== Associated neurological and psychological conditions ===
Confabulations are often symptoms of various syndromes and psychopathologies in the adult population, including Korsakoff's syndrome, Alzheimer's disease, schizophrenia, and traumatic brain injury.

Wernicke–Korsakoff syndrome is a neurological disorder typically characterized by years of alcohol use disorder characterized by excessive alcohol consumption and a nutritional thiamine deficiency. Confabulation is one salient symptom of this syndrome. A study on confabulation in Korsakoff's patients found that they are subject to provoked confabulation when prompted with questions pertaining to episodic memory, not semantic memory, and when prompted with questions where the appropriate response would be "I don't know." This suggests that confabulation in these patients is "domain-specific". Korsakoff's patients who confabulate are more likely than healthy adults to falsely recognize distractor words, suggesting that false recognition is a "confabulatory behavior".

Alzheimer's disease is a condition with both neurological and psychological components. It is a form of dementia associated with severe frontal lobe dysfunction. Confabulation in individuals with Alzheimer's is often more spontaneous than it is in other conditions, especially in the advanced stages of the disease. Alzheimer's patients demonstrate comparable abilities to encode information as healthy elderly adults, suggesting that impairments in encoding are not associated with confabulation. However, as seen in Korsakoff's patients, confabulation in Alzheimer's patients is higher when prompted with questions investigating episodic memory. Researchers suggest this is due to damage in the posterior cortical regions of the brain, which is a symptom characteristic of Alzheimer's disease.

Schizophrenia is a psychological disorder in which confabulation is sometimes observed. Although confabulation is usually coherent in its presentation, confabulations of schizophrenic patients are often delusional. Researchers have noted that these patients tend to make up delusions on the spot which are often fantastic and become increasingly elaborate with questioning. Unlike patients with Korsakoff's and Alzheimer's, patients with schizophrenia are more likely to confabulate when prompted with questions regarding their semantic memories, as opposed to episodic memory prompting. In addition, confabulation does not appear to be related to any memory deficit in schizophrenic patients. This is contrary to most forms of confabulation. Also, confabulations made by schizophrenic patients often do not involve the creation of new information, but instead involve an attempt by the patient to reconstruct actual details of a past event.

Traumatic brain injury (TBI) can also result in confabulation. Research has shown that patients with damage to the inferior medial frontal lobe confabulate significantly more than patients with damage to the posterior area and healthy controls. This suggests that this region is key in producing confabulatory responses, and that memory deficit is important but not necessary in confabulation. Additionally, research suggests that confabulation can be seen in patients with frontal lobe syndrome, which involves an insult to the frontal lobe as a result of disease or traumatic brain injury (TBI). Finally, rupture of the anterior or posterior communicating artery, subarachnoid hemorrhage, and encephalitis are also possible causes of confabulation.

=== Location of brain lesions ===
Confabulation is believed to be a result of damage to the right frontal lobe of the brain. In particular, damage can be localized to the ventromedial frontal lobes and other structures fed by the anterior communicating artery (ACoA), including the basal forebrain, septum, fornix, cingulate gyrus, cingulum, anterior hypothalamus, and head of the caudate nucleus.

Behaviourally spontaneous confabulation may occur in the context of dementia or the Wernicke–Korsakoff syndrome where brain damage is difficult to localise. If it is due to circumscribed brain damage (e.g., after ruptured aneurysm of the anterior communicating artery, traumatic brain injury, stroke), lesions involved the posterior medial orbitofrontal cortex (area 13) or an area directly connected with it.

=== Developmental differences ===
While some recent literature has suggested that older adults may be more susceptible than their younger counterparts to have false memories, the majority of research on forced confabulation centers around children. Children are particularly susceptible to forced confabulations based on their high suggestibility. When forced to recall confabulated events, children are less likely to remember that they had previously confabulated these situations, and they are more likely than their adult counterparts to come to remember these confabulations as real events that transpired. Research suggests that this inability to distinguish between past confabulatory and real events is centered on developmental differences in source monitoring. Due to underdeveloped encoding and critical reasoning skills, children's ability to distinguish real memories from false memories may be impaired. It may also be that younger children lack the meta-memory processes required to remember confabulated versus non-confabulated events. Children's meta-memory processes may also be influenced by expectancies or biases, in that they believe that highly plausible false scenarios are not confabulated. However, when knowingly being tested for accuracy, children are more likely to respond, "I don't know" at a rate comparable to adults for unanswerable questions than they are to confabulate. Ultimately, misinformation effects can be minimized by tailoring individual interviews to the specific developmental stage, often based on age, of the participant.

=== Provoked versus spontaneous confabulations ===
There is evidence to support different cognitive mechanisms for provoked and spontaneous confabulation. One study suggested that spontaneous confabulation may be a result of an amnesic patient's inability to distinguish the chronological order of events in their memory. In contrast, provoked confabulation may be a compensatory mechanism, in which the patient tries to make up for their memory deficiency by attempting to demonstrate competency in recollection.

=== Confidence in false memories ===
Confabulation of events or situations may lead to an eventual acceptance of the confabulated information as true. For instance, people who knowingly lie about a situation may eventually come to believe that their lies are truthful with time. In an interview setting, people are more likely to confabulate in situations in which they are presented false information by another person, as opposed to when they self-generate these falsehoods. Further, people are more likely to accept false information as true when they are interviewed at a later time (after the event in question) than those who are interviewed immediately or soon after the event. Affirmative feedback for confabulated responses is also shown to increase the confabulator's confidence in their response. For instance, in culprit identification, if a witness falsely identifies a member of a line-up, he will be more confident in his identification if the interviewer provides affirmative feedback. This effect of confirmatory feedback appears to last over time, as witnesses will even remember the confabulated information months later.

=== Among normal subjects ===
On rare occasions, confabulation can also be seen in normal subjects. It is currently unclear how completely healthy individuals produce confabulations. It is possible that these individuals are in the process of developing some type of organic condition that is causing their confabulation symptoms. It is not uncommon, however, for the general population to display some very mild symptoms of provoked confabulations. Subtle distortions and intrusions in memory are commonly produced by normal subjects when they remember something poorly.

== Diagnosis and treatment ==
Spontaneous confabulations, due to their involuntary nature, cannot be manipulated in a laboratory setting. However, provoked confabulations can be researched in various theoretical contexts. The mechanisms found to underlie provoked confabulations can be applied to spontaneous confabulation mechanisms. The basic premise of researching confabulation comprises finding errors and distortions in memory tests of an individual.

=== Deese–Roediger–McDermott lists ===
Confabulations can be detected in the context of the Deese–Roediger–McDermott paradigm by using the Deese–Roediger–McDermott lists. Participants listen to audio recordings of several lists of words centered around a theme, known as the critical word. The participants are later asked to recall the words on their list. If the participant recalls the critical word, which was never explicitly stated in the list, it is considered a confabulation. Participants often have a false memory for the critical word.

=== Recognition tasks ===
Confabulations can also be researched by using continuous recognition tasks. These tasks are often used in conjunction with confidence ratings. Generally, in a recognition task, participants are rapidly presented with pictures. Some of these pictures are shown once; others are shown multiple times. Participants press a key if they have seen the picture previously. Following a period of time, participants repeat the task. More errors on the second task, versus the first, are indicative of confusion, representing false memories.

=== Free recall tasks ===
Confabulations can also be detected using a free recall task, such as a self-narrative task. Participants are asked to recall stories (semantic or autobiographical) that are highly familiar to them. The stories recalled are encoded for errors that could be classified as distortions in memory. Distortions could include falsifying true story elements or including details from a completely different story. Errors such as these would be indicative of confabulations.

=== Treatment ===
Treatment for confabulation is somewhat dependent on the cause or source, if identifiable. For example, treatment of Wernicke–Korsakoff syndrome involves large doses of vitamin B in order to reverse the thiamine deficiency. If there is no known physiological cause, more general cognitive techniques may be used to treat confabulation. A case study published in 2000 showed that Self-Monitoring Training (SMT) reduced delusional confabulations. Furthermore, improvements were maintained at a three-month follow-up and were found to generalize to everyday settings. Although this treatment seems promising, more rigorous research is necessary to determine the efficacy of SMT in the general confabulation population.

== Research ==
Although significant gains have been made in the understanding of confabulation in recent years, there is still much to be learned. One group of researchers in particular has laid out several important questions for future study. They suggest more information is needed regarding the neural systems that support the different cognitive processes necessary for normal source monitoring. They also proposed the idea of developing a standard neuropsychological test battery able to discriminate between the different types of confabulations. And there is a considerable amount of debate regarding the best approach to organizing and combining neuro-imaging, pharmacological, and cognitive/behavioral approaches to understand confabulation.

In a recent review article, another group of researchers contemplate issues concerning the distinctions between delusions and confabulation. They question whether delusions and confabulation should be considered distinct or overlapping disorders and, if overlapping, to what degree? They also discuss the role of unconscious processes in confabulation. Some researchers suggest that unconscious emotional and motivational processes are potentially just as important as cognitive and memory problems. Finally, they raise the question of where to draw the line between the pathological and the nonpathological. Delusion-like beliefs and confabulation-like fabrications are commonly seen in healthy individuals. What are the important differences between patients with similar etiology who do and do not confabulate? Since the line between pathological and nonpathological is likely blurry, should we take a more dimensional approach to confabulation? Research suggests that confabulation occurs along a continuum of implausibility, bizarreness, content, conviction, preoccupation, and distress, and impact on daily life.

== See also ==
- Compare with:
  - Anosognosia – Unawareness of one's own illness, symptoms or impairments
  - Cryptomnesia – Memory bias
  - False memory – Psychological occurrence
  - Hallucination – Perception that only seems real
  - Hindsight bias – Type of confirmation bias
  - Misinformation effect – Effect of later events on a previous memory
  - Revelation – Communication from a deity
  - Rosy retrospection – Disproportionate favor towards the past
- Not to be confused with:
  - Gaslighting – Type of psychological manipulation
  - Hoaxes – Widespread deliberate fabrication presented as truth
  - Phishing – Form of social engineering
  - Scams (swindles):
    - Confidence tricks – Attempt to defraud a person or group
    - Fraud – Intentional deception to gain unlawfully
