= Thiamine transporter 2 =

Protein-coding gene in the species Homo sapiens

SLC19A3

Identifiers
- Aliases: SLC19A3, BBGD, THMD2, THTR2, solute carrier family 19 member 3, thTr-2
- External IDs: OMIM: 606152; MGI: 1931307; GeneCards: SLC19A3

Gene location (Human)
Chr.	Chromosome 2 (human)
Band	2q36.3	Start	227,683,763 bp
Band	2q36.3	End	227,718,028 bp

Gene location (Mouse)
Chr.	Chromosome 1 (mouse)
Band	1 C5|1 42.65 cM	Start	82,990,244 bp
Band	1 C5|1 42.65 cM	End	83,016,169 bp
RNA expression pattern
Bgee	Human / Mouse (ortholog); Top expressed in: subcutaneous adipose tissue; abdominal fat; placenta; right lung; right lobe of liver; jejunal mucosa; gallbladder; duodenum; epithelium of colon; testicle / Top expressed in: duodenum; right kidney; proximal tubule; morula; lumbar subsegment of spinal cord; human kidney; epithelium of lens; embryo; embryo; visual cortex; More reference expression data
BioGPS	n/a
Gene ontology
Molecular function	thiamine transmembrane transporter activity; vitamin transmembrane transporter activity
Cellular component	integral component of membrane; plasma membrane; membrane
Biological process	thiamine-containing compound metabolic process; thiamine transport; thiamine transmembrane transport; vitamin transport; transmembrane transport
Sources:Amigo / QuickGO
Orthologs
Databases	NCBI: entry; OMA: entry
Species	Human	Mouse
Entrez	80704	80721
Ensembl	ENSG00000135917	ENSMUSG00000038496
UniProt	Q9BZV2	Q99PL8
RefSeq (mRNA)	NM_025243; NM_001371411; NM_001371412; NM_001371413; NM_001371414	NM_030556
RefSeq (protein)	NP_079519; NP_001358340; NP_001358341; NP_001358342; NP_001358343	NP_085033
Location (UCSC)	Chr 2: 227.68 – 227.72 Mb	Chr 1: 82.99 – 83.02 Mb
PubMed search
- Wikidata
View/Edit Human	View/Edit Mouse

Thiamine transporter 2 (ThTr-2), also known as solute carrier family 19 member 3, is a protein that in humans is encoded by the SLC19A3 gene. SLC19A3 is a thiamine transporter.

== Function ==
ThTr-2 is a ubiquitously expressed transmembrane thiamine transporter that lacks folate transport activity.

It is specifically inhibited by chloroquine.

== Clinical significance ==
Mutations in this gene cause biotin-thiamine-responsive basal ganglia disease (BTBGD); a recessive disorder manifesting in childhood, which – if untreated – progresses to chronic encephalopathy, dystonia, quadriparesis, and eventually death. Patients with BTBGD exhibit bilateral necrosis in the head of the caudate nucleus and in the putamen. The progression of symptoms is paused by the lifelong administration of both high doses of biotin and thiamine. The residual symptoms vary widely between individuals, often encompassing paraparesis, mild mental retardation, or dystonia. Administration of thiamine by itself is ineffective in the treatment of this disorder. Experiments have failed to show that this protein can transport biotin, but the expression of the transporter is starkly reduced with even just latent biotin deficiency. Mutations in this gene also cause a Wernicke's-like encephalopathy.
