= Thiamine transporter 1 =

Mammalian protein found in humans

SLC19A2

Identifiers
- Aliases: SLC19A2, TC1, THMD1, THT1, THTR1, TRMA, solute carrier family 19 member 2
- External IDs: OMIM: 603941; MGI: 1928761; GeneCards: SLC19A2

Gene location (Human)
Chr.	Chromosome 1 (human)
Band	1q24.2	Start	169,463,909 bp
Band	1q24.2	End	169,485,944 bp

Gene location (Mouse)
Chr.	Chromosome 1 (mouse)
Band	1 H2.2|1 71.56 cM	Start	164,076,615 bp
Band	1 H2.2|1 71.56 cM	End	164,092,954 bp
RNA expression pattern
Bgee	Human / Mouse (ortholog); Top expressed in: secondary oocyte; gastrocnemius muscle; tibialis anterior muscle; Skeletal muscle tissue of rectus abdominis; biceps brachii; deltoid muscle; muscle of thigh; gastric mucosa; buccal mucosa cell; body of tongue / Top expressed in: retinal pigment epithelium; left lobe of liver; facial motor nucleus; medullary collecting duct; cornea; endothelial cell of lymphatic vessel; interventricular septum; motor neuron; cumulus cell; spermatocyte; More reference expression data
BioGPS	n/a
Gene ontology
Molecular function	folic acid transmembrane transporter activity; protein binding; thiamine transmembrane transporter activity; vitamin transmembrane transporter activity
Cellular component	integral component of membrane; plasma membrane; membrane
Biological process	thiamine-containing compound metabolic process; thiamine transport; folic acid transport; thiamine transmembrane transport; vitamin transport; transmembrane transport
Sources:Amigo / QuickGO
Orthologs
Databases	NCBI: entry; OMA: entry
Species	Human	Mouse
Entrez	10560	116914
Ensembl	ENSG00000117479	ENSMUSG00000040918
UniProt	O60779	Q9EQN9
RefSeq (mRNA)	NM_006996; NM_001319667	NM_001276455; NM_054087
RefSeq (protein)	NP_001306596; NP_008927	NP_001263384; NP_473428
Location (UCSC)	Chr 1: 169.46 – 169.49 Mb	Chr 1: 164.08 – 164.09 Mb
PubMed search
- Wikidata
View/Edit Human	View/Edit Mouse

Thiamine transporter 1, also known as thiamine carrier 1 (TC1) or solute carrier family 19 member 2 (SLC19A2) is a protein that in humans is encoded by the SLC19A2 gene. SLC19A2 is a thiamine transporter. Mutations in this gene cause thiamine-responsive megaloblastic anemia syndrome (TRMA), which is an autosomal recessive disorder characterized by diabetes mellitus, megaloblastic anemia and sensorineural deafness.

== Structure ==
The SLC19A2 gene is located on the q arm of chromosome 1 in position 24.2 and spans 22,062 base pairs. The gene produces a 55.4 kDa protein composed of 497 amino acids. In the encoded protein (TC1), a multi-pass membrane protein located in the cell membrane, the N-terminus and C-terminus face the cytosol. This gene has 6 exons while the protein has 12 putative transmembrane domains, with 3 phosphorylation sites in putative intracellular domains, 2 N-glycolysation sites in putative extracellular domains, and a 17-amino acid long G protein-coupled receptor signature sequence. The thiamine transporter protein encoded by SLC19A2 has a 40% shared amino acid identity with the folate transporter SLC19A1. The N-terminal domain and the sequence between the C-terminal domain and sixth transmembrane domain are required for proper localization of this protein to the cell membrane.

== Function ==
The encoded protein is a high-affinity transporter specific to the intake of thiamine. Thiamine transport is not inhibited by other organic cations nor affected by sodium ion concentration; it is stimulated by a proton gradient directed outward, with an optimal pH between 8.0 and 8.5. TC1 is transported to the cell membrane by intracellular vesicles via microtubules.

== Clinical significance ==
Mutations in the SLC19A2 gene can cause thiamine-responsive megaloblastic anemia syndrome (TRMA), which is an autosomal recessive disease characterized by megaloblastic anemia, diabetes mellitus, and sensorineural deafness. Onset is typically between infancy and adolescence, but all of the cardinal findings are often not present initially. The anemia, and sometimes the diabetes, improves with high doses of thiamine. Other more variable features include optic atrophy, congenital heart defects, short stature, and stroke.

A 3.8 kb transcript is expressed variably in most tissues, highest in skeletal and cardiac muscle, followed by medium expression placenta, heart, liver, kidney cells and low expression in lung cells. In melanocytic cells SLC19A2 gene expression may be regulated by MITF.

== Interactions ==
This protein interacts with CERS2.
