= 4-Amino-5-hydroxymethyl-2-methylpyrimidine =

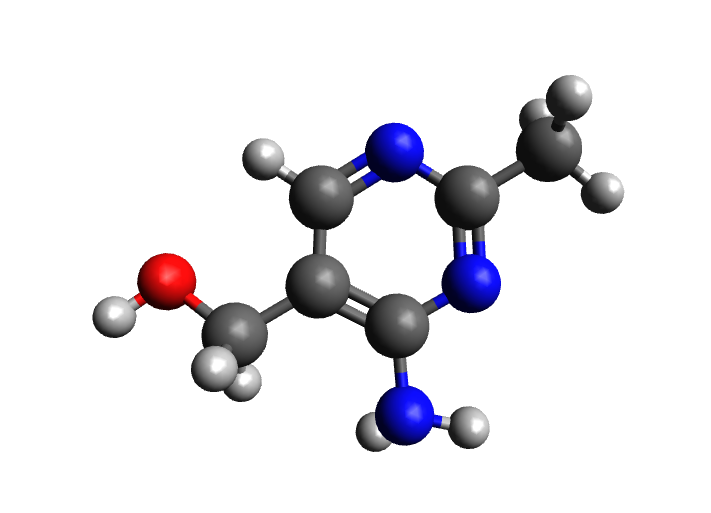

Names
- Preferred IUPAC name (4-Amino-2-methylpyrimidin-5-yl)methanol
- Other names HMP

Identifiers
CAS Number	HMP: 73-67-6; HMP-P: 945-94-8; HMP-PP: 841-01-0
3D model (JSmol)	HMP: Interactive image; HMP-P: Interactive image; HMP-PP: Interactive image
ChEBI	HMP: CHEBI:16892; HMP-P: CHEBI:18032
ChemSpider	HMP: 756; HMP-P: 211; HMP-PP: 17283642
KEGG	HMP: C01279; HMP-P: C04556
PubChem CID	HMP: 777; HMP-P: 24971456; HMP-PP: 16126786
UNII	HMP: G62V17J09J
- InChI: HMP: InChI=1S/C6H9N3O/c1-4-8-2-5(3-10)6(7)9-4/h2,10H,3H2,1H3,(H2,7,8,9) Key: VUTBELPREDJDDH-UHFFFAOYSA-N; HMP-P: InChI=1S/C6H10N3O4P/c1-4-8-2-5(6(7)9-4)3-13-14(10,11)12/h2H,3H2,1H3,(H2,7,8,9)(H2,10,11,12)/p-1 Key: PKYFHKIYHBRTPI-UHFFFAOYSA-M; HMP-PP: InChI=1S/C6H11N3O7P2/c1-4-8-2-5(6(7)9-4)3-15-18(13,14)16-17(10,11)12/h2H,3H2,1H3,(H,13,14)(H2,7,8,9)(H2,10,11,12)/p-2 Key: AGQJQCFEPUVXNK-UHFFFAOYSA-L
- SMILES: HMP: CC1=NC=C(C(=N1)N)CO; HMP-P: CC1=NC=C(C(=N1)N)COP(=O)(O)[O-]; HMP-PP: CC1=NC=C(C(=N1)N)COP(=O)([O-])OP(=O)(O)[O-]
- Except where otherwise noted, data are given for materials in their standard state (at 25 °C [77 °F], 100 kPa). Infobox references

Within the field of biochemistry, 4-amino-5-hydroxymethyl-2-methylpyrimidine (HMP) also known as toxopyrimidine together with its mono phosphate (HMP-P) and pyrophosphate (HMP-PP) esters are biogenetic precursors to the important biochemical cofactor thiamine pyrophosphate (TPP), a derivative of thiamine (vitamin B_{1}).

HMP, HMP-P and HMP-PP are found along with thiamine forms in a wide variety of living organisms. Thiamine in various salt, formulation and biological matrix forms are used to supplement human and animal diets because these organisms lack the capability to produce it. Methodologies are being sought for biotechnology-based production of thiamine forms and for increasing thiamine content in food sources.

== TPP biogenesis ==
In microorganisms and plants TPP results from coupling of pyrimidine fragment HMP-PP with thiazole fragment HET-P to give thiamine monophosphate, followed by conversion to the pyrophosphate.

Biogenesis of HMP-P and HET-P vary with types of organism.

== HMP-P biogenesis ==
In bacteria, HMP-P arises by conversion of the purine biosynthetic precursor 5-aminoimidazole ribotide (AIR) through the action of enzymes such as phosphomethylpyrimidine synthase, a member of the radical SAM superfamily. Studies using isotopically labelled AIR have shown which atoms carry into the product. Mechanisms by which this occurs are not yet known with certainty.

In yeasts, HMP-P is derived from metabolites of histidine and pyridoxine. Some of these transformations appear to be catalyzed by radical SAM enzymes. Isotopically labelled precursors have been used to investigate this biogenesis. Mechanisms of the transformations are unknown.

In Salmonella, HMP-P can be derived independently of purine biogenesis when AICAR is available.

In algae, thiamine forms and precursors are scavenged by uptake from water of exogenous products from other organisms. In higher plants, thiamine biogenesis resembles that of bacteria. In some circumstances, thiamine forms and precursors may be obtained through symbiotic relationships with microorganisms in the soil.

Genes relevant for transformations in the biogenesis of HMP-P, HET-P, and TPP have been identified in various organisms and some of the proteins resulting from their expression have been characterized. Biosynthesis of TPP is feedback inhibited through actions of a riboswitch.

Research is ongoing towards understanding biochemistry involved and towards facilitating technologies of socioeconomic value for supply of thiamine in various forms.

== Related technologies ==
Commercially available salts thiamine chloride and thiamine nitrate are produced at scales of thousands of tons annually by chemistry-based manufacturing processes in Europe and Asia. These salts are supplied for formulations for supplementation of human diet and as feed additives for cattle, swine, poultry and fish.

Research for potential biotechnology-based production of thiamine has resulted in patent applications claiming fermentation using recombinant microorganisms modified to deregulate feedback inhibition and allow release of thiamine forms to the media as demonstrated at small scale.

Thiamine forms and their bio-precursors are produced at very large scale in biological matrices such as yeast, grains, plants and meats widely consumed as food and feed. Research into genetic modification of plants. has led to higher levels of thiamine in foodstuffs, such as rice. Use of thiamine forms and their bio-precursors by various means such as seed coating or soil and foliar fertilization to improve plant growth and properties are being investigated.
