= Thiamine triphosphate =

Identifiers
CAS Number	3475-65-8
3D model (JSmol)	Interactive image
ChEBI	CHEBI:18284
ChemSpider	17927
MeSH	Thiamine+triphosphate
PubChem CID	18989
UNII	464M6AQ7IV
CompTox Dashboard (EPA)	DTXSID80956233
- InChI: InChI=1S/C12H19N4O10P3S/c1-8-11(30-7-16(8)6-10-5-14-9(2)15-12(10)13)3-4-24-28(20,21)26-29(22,23)25-27(17,18)19/h5,7H,3-4,6H2,1-2H3,(H5-,13,14,15,17,18,19,20,21,22,23) Key: IWLROWZYZPNOFC-UHFFFAOYSA-N; InChI=1/C12H19N4O10P3S/c1-8-11(30-7-16(8)6-10-5-14-9(2)15-12(10)13)3-4-24-28(20,21)26-29(22,23)25-27(17,18)19/h5,7H,3-4,6H2,1-2H3,(H5-,13,14,15,17,18,19,20,21,22,23) Key: IWLROWZYZPNOFC-UHFFFAOYAE
- SMILES: Cc1c(sc[n+]1Cc2cnc(nc2N)C)CCOP(=O)(O)OP(=O)(O)OP(=O)(O)[O-]

Properties
Chemical formula	C_{12}H_{19}N_{4}O_{10}P_{3}S
Molar mass	504.288
- Except where otherwise noted, data are given for materials in their standard state (at 25 °C [77 °F], 100 kPa). verify (what is ?) Infobox references

Thiamine triphosphate (ThTP) is a biomolecule found in most organisms including bacteria, fungi, plants and animals. Chemically, it is the triphosphate derivative of the vitamin thiamine.

== Function ==
It has been proposed that ThTP has a specific role in nerve excitability, but this has never been confirmed and recent results suggest that ThTP probably plays a role in cell energy metabolism. Low or absent levels of thiamine triphosphate have been found in Leigh's disease.

In E. coli, ThTP is accumulated in the presence of glucose during amino acid starvation. On the other hand, suppression of the carbon source leads to the accumulation, of adenosine thiamine triphosphate (AThTP).

== Metabolism ==
It has been shown that in brain ThTP is synthesized in mitochondria by a chemiosmotic mechanism, perhaps similar to ATP synthase. In mammals, ThTP is hydrolyzed to thiamine pyrophosphate (ThDP) by a specific thiamine-triphosphatase. It can also be converted into ThDP by thiamine-diphosphate kinase.

== History ==
Thiamine triphosphate (ThTP) was chemically synthesized in 1948 at a time when the only organic triphosphate known was ATP. The first claim of the existence of ThTP in living organisms was made in rat liver, followed by baker’s yeast. Its presence was later confirmed in rat tissues and in plants germs, but not in seeds, where thiamine was essentially unphosphorylated. In all those studies, ThTP was separated from other thiamine derivatives using a paper chromatographic method, followed by oxidation in fluorescent thiochrome compounds with ferricyanide in alkaline solution. This method is at best semi-quantitative, and the development of liquid chromatographic methods suggested that ThTP represents far less than 10% of total thiamine in animal tissues.
