= Hydroxyethylthiazole kinase =

Identifiers
- EC no.: 2.7.1.50
- CAS no.: 9026-56-6

Databases
- IntEnz: IntEnz view
- BRENDA: BRENDA entry
- ExPASy: NiceZyme view
- KEGG: KEGG entry
- MetaCyc: metabolic pathway
- PRIAM: profile
- PDB structures: RCSB PDB PDBe PDBsum
- Gene Ontology: AmiGO / QuickGO
Search
- PMC: articles
- PubMed: articles
- NCBI: proteins

Hydroxyethylthiazole kinase family
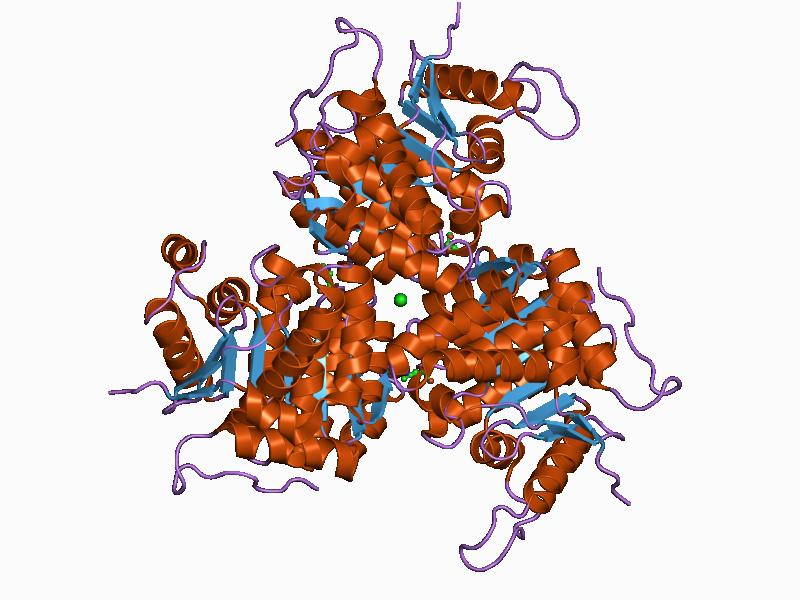
- crystal structure of native thiazole kinase in the monoclinic form

Identifiers
- Symbol: HK
- Pfam: PF02110
- Pfam clan: CL0118
- InterPro: IPR000417
- SCOP2: 1c3q / SCOPe / SUPFAM
Available protein structures:
- PDB: IPR000417 PF02110 (ECOD; PDBsum)
- AlphaFold: IPR000417; PF02110

Hydroxyethylthiazole kinase (EC 2.7.1.50) is an enzyme that catalyzes the chemical reaction

ATP +
4-methyl-5-thiazoleethanol
ADP +
4-methyl-5-hydroxyethylthiazole phosphate

The enzyme characterised from baker's yeast converts 4-methyl-5-thiazoleethanol to 4-methyl-5-hydroxyethylthiazole phosphate by transferring a phosphate group from the cofactor, adenosine triphosphate (ATP), which is converted to adenosine diphosphate (ADP). This reaction is a step in the biosynthesis of thiamine (vitamin B_{1}), together with that catalysed by hydroxymethylpyrimidine kinase. Hydroxyethylthiazole kinase expression is regulated at the mRNA level by intracellular thiamin pyrophosphate. Thiamine pyrophosphate, a required cofactor for many enzymes in the cell, is synthesised de novo in Salmonella typhimurium.

Thiamine

This enzyme is a transferase, specifically one transferring phosphorus-containing groups (phosphotransferases) with an alcohol group as acceptor. The systematic name of this enzyme class is ATP:4-methyl-5-(2-hydroxyethyl)thiazole 2-phosphotransferase. Other names in common use include hydroxyethylthiazole kinase (phosphorylating), and 4-methyl-5-(beta-hydroxyethyl)thiazole kinase.

== Structural studies ==
As of late 2007, 6 structures have been solved for this class of enzymes, with PDB accession codes PDB: 1C3Q, PDB: 1EKK, PDB: 1EKQ, PDB: 1ESJ, PDB: 1ESQ, and PDB: 1V8A.
