= Thiamine-triphosphatase =

Class of enzymes

thiamin triphosphatase

Identifiers
- EC no.: 3.6.1.28
- CAS no.: 9068-47-7

Databases
- BRENDA: enzyme data
- ExPASy: NiceZyme view
- KEGG: enzyme entry
- MetaCyc: metabolic pathway
- Rhea: reactions
- PDB structures: RCSB PDB PDBe PDBsum
- Gene Ontology: AmiGO / QuickGO
Search
- PMC: articles
- PubMed: articles
- NCBI: proteins

thiamine triphosphatase

Identifiers
- Symbol: THTPA
- NCBI gene: 79178
- HGNC: 18987
- RefSeq: NM_024328
- UniProt: Q9BU02

Other data
- EC number: 3.6.1.28
- Locus: Chr. 14 q11.2
Search for
- Structures: Swiss-model
- Domains: InterPro

Thiamine-triphosphatase is an enzyme characterised from rat brain involved in thiamine metabolism. It catalyzes the hydrolysis of thiamine triphosphate to thiamine diphosphate and orthophosphate (P_{i}):

thiamine triphosphate
H_{2}O
P_{i}
thiamine diphosphate

Thiamine triphosphate is widespread in bacteria, fungi, plants and invertebrates, but the enzyme has been found only in mammals, sea anemone and zebrafish.

This enzyme is an acid anhydride hydrolase, specifically those acting on phosphorus-containing anhydrides. Its systematic name is thiamine triphosphate phosphohydrolase.

== Structural studies ==
As of late 2007, only one structure has been solved for this class of enzymes, with the PDB accession code PDB: 2JMU.

== See also ==
- Thiamine-diphosphate kinase
