= Phosphomethylpyrimidine kinase =

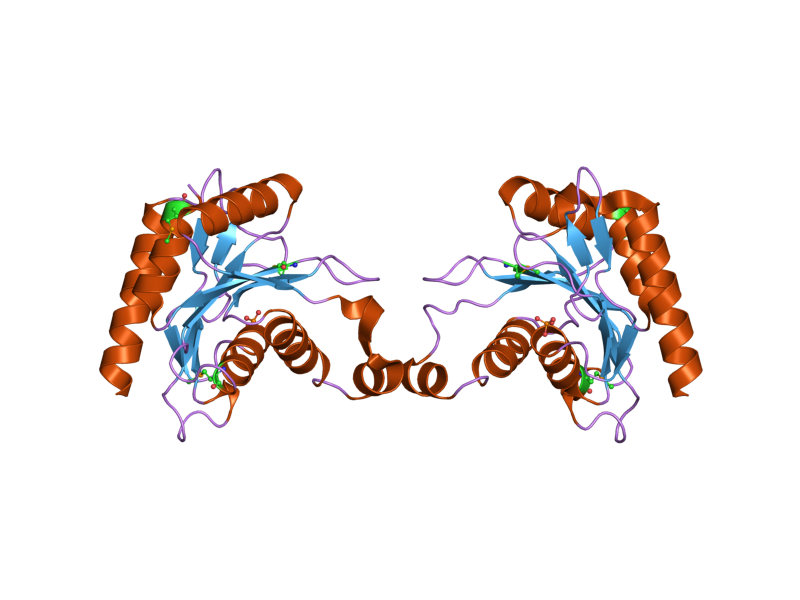

Identifiers
- EC no.: 2.7.4.7
- CAS no.: 37278-18-5

Databases
- IntEnz: IntEnz view
- BRENDA: BRENDA entry
- ExPASy: NiceZyme view
- KEGG: KEGG entry
- MetaCyc: metabolic pathway
- PRIAM: profile
- PDB structures: RCSB PDB PDBe PDBsum
- Gene Ontology: AmiGO / QuickGO
Search
- PMC: articles
- PubMed: articles
- NCBI: proteins

Phosphomethylpyrimidine kinase (EC 2.7.4.7) is an enzyme that catalyzes the chemical reaction

4-amino-2-methyl-5-phosphooxymethylpyrimidine
ATP
ADP
ATP
ADP
4-amino-2-methyl-5-diphosphooxymethylpyrimidine

The enzyme characterised from baker's yeast converts 4-amino-2-methyl-5-phosphooxymethylpyrimidine to 4-amino-2-methyl-5-diphosphooxymethylpyrimidine by transferring a phosphate group from the cofactor, adenosine triphosphate (ATP), which is converted to adenosine diphosphate (ADP). The starting material is biosynthesized from toxopyrimidine by the enzyme hydroxymethylpyrimidine kinase. These reactions are steps in the biosynthesis of thiamine (vitamin B_{1}).

Thiamine

This enzyme is a transferase, specifically one transferring phosphorus-containing groups (phosphotransferases) with a phosphate group as acceptor. The systematic name of this enzyme class is ATP:(4-amino-2-methylpyrimidin-5-yl)methyl-phosphate phosphotransferase. Other names in common use include hydroxymethylpyrimidine phosphokinase, and ATP:4-amino-2-methyl-5-phosphomethylpyrimidine phosphotransferase.

== Structural studies ==
As of late 2007, 4 structures have been solved for this class of enzymes, with PDB accession codes PDB: 1JXH, PDB: 1JXI, PDB: 1UB0, and PDB: 2I5B.
