= Thiamine-diphosphate kinase =

Class of enzymes

Identifiers
- EC no.: 2.7.4.15
- CAS no.: 9075-79-0

Databases
- IntEnz: IntEnz view
- BRENDA: BRENDA entry
- ExPASy: NiceZyme view
- KEGG: KEGG entry
- MetaCyc: metabolic pathway
- PRIAM: profile
- PDB structures: RCSB PDB PDBe PDBsum
- Gene Ontology: AmiGO / QuickGO
Search
- PMC: articles
- PubMed: articles
- NCBI: proteins

Thiamine-diphosphate kinase is an enzyme involved in thiamine metabolism. It catalyzes the chemical reaction

thiamine pyrophosphate
ATP
ADP
ATP
ADP
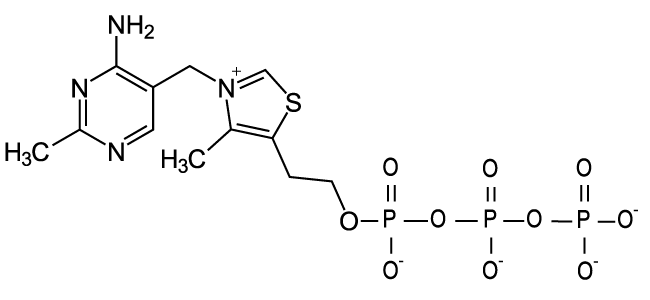
thiamine triphosphate

The enzyme characterised from maize converts thiamine pyrophosphate to thiamine triphosphate by transferring a phosphate group from the cofactor, adenosine triphosphate (ATP), which is converted to adenosine diphosphate (ADP).

== Nomenclature ==
The enzyme is a transferase, specifically one transferring phosphorus-containing groups (phosphotransferases) with a phosphate group as acceptor. The systematic name of this enzyme class is ATP:thiamine-diphosphate phosphotransferase. Other names in common use include ATP:thiamin-diphosphate phosphotransferase, TDP kinase, thiamin diphosphate kinase, thiamin diphosphate phosphotransferase, thiamin pyrophosphate kinase, thiamine diphosphate kinase, and protein bound thiamin diphosphate:ATP phosphoryltransferase.

== See also ==
- Thiamine-triphosphatase
