= Aminopyrimidine aminohydrolase =

Class of enzymes

Identifiers
- EC no.: 3.5.99.2
- CAS no.: 9024-80-0

Databases
- BRENDA: enzyme data
- ExPASy: NiceZyme view
- KEGG: enzyme entry
- MetaCyc: metabolic pathway
- Rhea: reactions
- PDB structures: RCSB PDB PDBe PDBsum
Search
- PMC: articles
- PubMed: articles
- NCBI: proteins

Aminopyrimidine aminohydrolase (EC 3.5.99.2, thiaminase, thiaminase II, tenA (gene)) is an enzyme with systematic name 4-amino-5-aminomethyl-2-methylpyrimidine aminohydrolase. It catalyses the hydrolysis of thiamine to toxopyrimidine and 4-methyl-5-thiazoleethanol, which is the first step in the salvage pathway for vitamin B_{1}:

thiamine

H_{2}O
H^{+}

toxopyrimidine

+

4-methyl-5-thiazoleethanol

This enzyme was previously known as thiaminase II. It also catalyses another reaction in thiamine salvage, the conversion of 4-amino-2-methyl-5-pyrimidinemethanamine to toxopyrimidine:

4-amino-5-aminomethyl-2-methylpyrimidine

H_{2}O
toxopyrimidine
