= Sulbutiamine =

Chemical compound

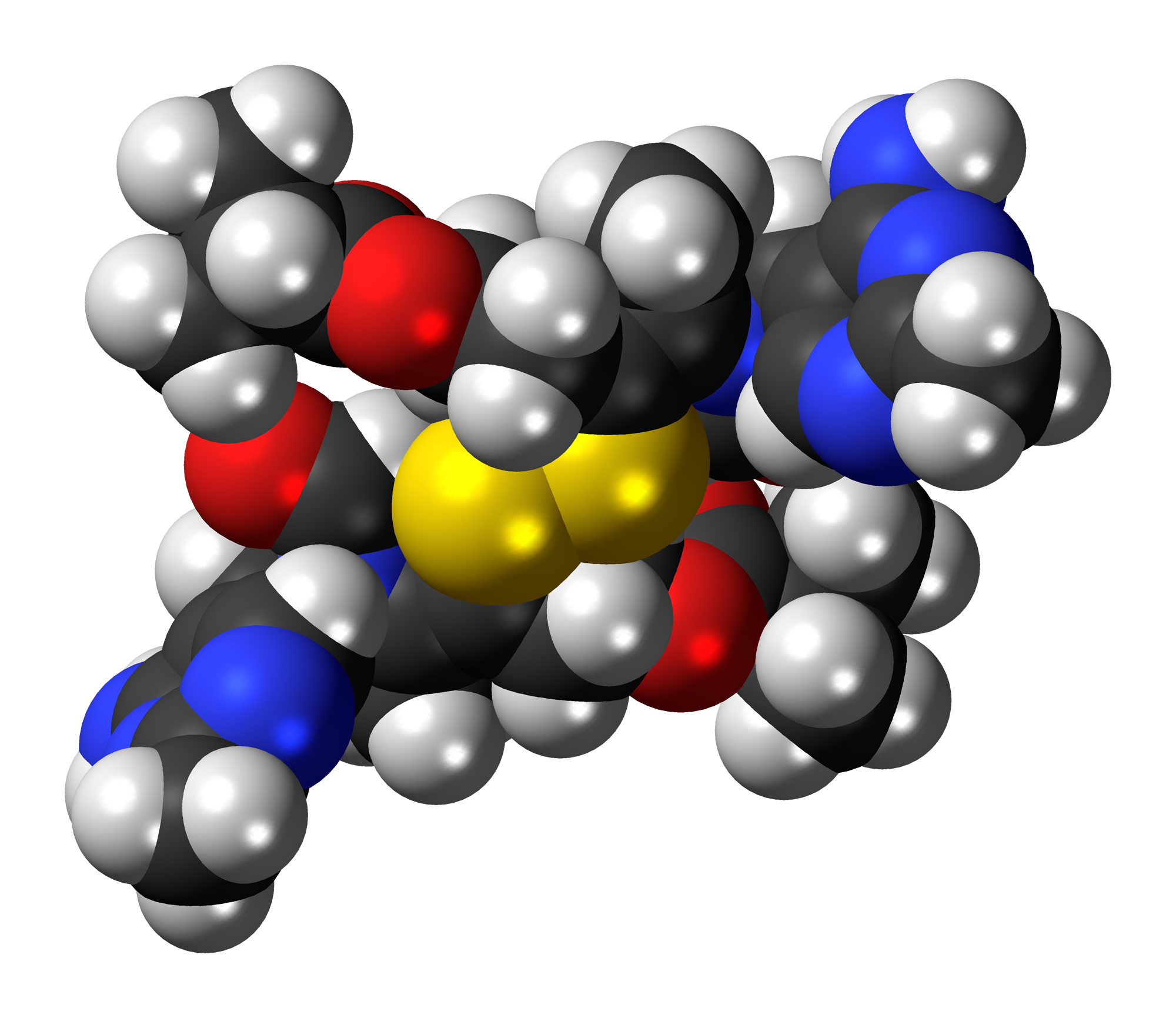

Clinical data
- Trade names: Arcalion, Enerion
- AHFS/Drugs.com: International Drug Names
- Routes of administration: By mouth
- ATC code: A11DA02 (WHO)

Pharmacokinetic data
- Elimination half-life: 5 hours
- Excretion: Renal

Identifiers
- IUPAC name: [4-[(4-amino-2-methyl-pyrimidin-5-yl)methyl-formyl-amino]-3-[2-[(4-amino-2-methyl-pyrimidin-5-yl)methyl-formyl-amino]-5-(2-methylpropanoyloxy)pent-2-en-3-yl]disulfanyl-pent-3-enyl] 2-methylpropanoate
- CAS Number: 3286-46-2
- PubChem CID: 71124
- ChemSpider: 16736830
- UNII: 42NCM1BW43
- KEGG: D01319
- CompTox Dashboard (EPA): DTXSID5046641
- ECHA InfoCard: 100.019.944

Chemical and physical data
- Formula: C_{32}H_{46}N_{8}O_{6}S_{2}
- Molar mass: 702.89 g·mol^{−1}
- 3D model (JSmol): Interactive image
- SMILES: Nc2nc(C)ncc2CN(C=O)C(/C)=C(/CCOC(=O)C(C)C)SSC(/CCOC(=O)C(C)C)=C(/C)N(C=O)Cc1cnc(C)nc1N
- InChI: InChI=1S/C32H46N8O6S2/c1-19(2)31(43)45-11-9-27(21(5)39(17-41)15-25-13-35-23(7)37-29(25)33)47-48-28(10-12-46-32(44)20(3)4)22(6)40(18-42)16-26-14-36-24(8)38-30(26)34/h13-14,17-20H,9-12,15-16H2,1-8H3,(H2,33,35,37)(H2,34,36,38)/b27-21-,28-22-; Key:CKHJPWQVLKHBIH-ZDSKVHJSSA-N

Sulbutiamine sold under the brand names Arcalion, Enerion, and Sulbuxin is a synthetic derivative of thiamine (vitamin B_{1}). In France, it is used to treat symptoms of weakness or fatigue. In Uruguay, it is prescribed when there is thiamine deficiency, mainly in patients with asthenia, overwork, apathy, depressive states, memory disorders, and iatrogenic disorders of wakefulness. It is also sold as a dietary supplement. Sulbutiamine was discovered in Japan as part of an effort to develop useful thiamine derivatives.

== Uses ==
Sulbutiamine is used to treat asthenia (weakness), though is not clear if it is effective in alleviating drowsiness. It is also used to treat thiamine deficiency and poor concentration. Being a potent cholinergic, sulbutiamine is a popular nootropic, with users reporting enhanced memory, focus, and improved mood and motivation. Endurance athletes may use it to try to enhance their performance.

== Adverse effects ==
Adverse effects found in clinical trials are usually limited to headache and gastrointestinal discomfort when high doses are used. While daily use can result in tolerance and paradoxical drowsiness, increasing the dose is strongly discouraged and side effects can include diarrhea, bladder infections, bronchitis, back pain, abdominal pain, insomnia, constipation, gastroenteritis, headache, vertigo, and sore throat.

== History ==
Thiamine

Efforts to develop thiamine derivatives with better bioavailability than thiamine were conducted in the 1950s, mainly in Japan. These efforts led to the discovery of allicin (diallyl thiosulfinate) in garlic, which became a model for medicinal chemistry efforts to create other thiamine disulfides. The results included sulbutiamine, fursultiamine (thiamine tetrahydrofurfuryl disulfide) and benfotiamine. These compounds are hydrophobic, easily pass from the intestines to the bloodstream, and are reduced to thiamine by cysteine or glutathione.

It was first marketed in France by Servier in 1973 under the brand name Arcalion. The drug registration went through a validation procedure in France in the 1980s, which found that the use for treatment of fatigue was not supported by data. In January 1989, 100 mg tablet doses were discontinued in favour of 200 mg tablets.

== Research ==
Because thiamine deficiency causes problems with memory and other cognitive functions, thiamine and analogs like sulbutiamine have been studied in clinical trials in the 1980s and 1990s for age-associated cognitive decline.

Sulbutiamine has been explored in clinical trials as a potential treatment for chronic fatigue syndrome (CFS). Studies have also been undertaken to assess its impact on reversing age-related changes in the circadian system.

The pharmacology of sulbutiamine has been studied in various mice and rats; as of 2014 it appeared that sulbutiamine might be more effective in raising thiamine phosphate levels in the brain than benfotiamine and fursultiamine, but this has not been fully verified. University of Oxford studies indicate that it helps prevent apoptotic cell death, caused by trophic factor deprivation, in retinal ganglion cells.

In an uncontrollled clinical trial, sulbutiamine was reported to be effective in reducing fatigue in patients with multiple sclerosis.

== See also ==
- Vitamin B_{1} analogue
- Pyritinol
