= Vitamin B1 analogues =

Group of chemical compounds

Vitamin B_{1} analogues are analogues of vitamin B_{1}, thiamine. They typically have improved bioavailability relative to thiamine itself, and are used to treat conditions caused by vitamin B_{1} deficiency. These conditions include beriberi, Korsakoff's syndrome, Wernicke's encephalopathy and diabetic neuropathy.

== List of vitamin B_{1} analogues ==
Vitamin B_{1} analogues include:

- Acefurtiamine
- Acetiamine
- Allithiamine
- Beclotiamine
- Benfotiamine
- Bentiamine
- Bisbentiamine
- Cetotiamine
- Cycotiamine
- Fursultiamine
- Monophosphothiamine
- Octotiamine
- Prosultiamine
- Sulbutiamine
- Vintiamol

== See also ==
- B vitamins
- Thiamine pyrophosphate, a thiamine derivative
