= Oxalate oxidoreductase =

Identifiers
- EC no.: 1.2.7.10

Databases
- IntEnz: IntEnz view
- BRENDA: BRENDA entry
- ExPASy: NiceZyme view
- KEGG: KEGG entry
- MetaCyc: metabolic pathway
- PRIAM: profile
- PDB structures: RCSB PDB PDBe PDBsum
Search
- PMC: articles
- PubMed: articles
- NCBI: proteins

Oxalate oxidoreductases (EC 1.2.7.10) (OOR) are a relatively recently discovered group of enzymes that break down oxalate, a problematic molecule nutritionally. The first one to have been characterized has the systematic name oxalate:ferredoxin oxidoreductase. This enzyme catalyses the following chemical reaction:

oxalic acid
+ 2 oxidised ferredoxin
2 H^{+}
2 H^{+}
2 CO_{2} + 2 reduced ferredoxin

The enzyme is known to contain thiamine diphosphate and [4Fe-4S] iron–sulfur clusters.

Another OOR from acetogenic bacteria, a thiamine pyrophosphate (TPP)-dependent OOR, had its mechanism of action decoded step by step under X-ray crystallography to rather simplistically (one-carbon) split oxalate, producing low-potential electrons and CO_{2}.
