= Acetiamine =

Chemical compound

Clinical data
- Other names: NSC-290686, diacetylthiamine

Identifiers
- IUPAC name: [(Z)-3-acetylsulfanyl-4-[(4-amino-2-methylpyrimidin-5-yl)methyl-formylamino]pent-3-enyl] acetate
- CAS Number: 299-89-8
- PubChem CID: 3033984
- DrugBank: DB21187
- ChemSpider: 2298543
- UNII: SIJ2OU269U
- ChEBI: CHEBI:748398
- ChEMBL: ChEMBL421556
- CompTox Dashboard (EPA): DTXSID801043380

Chemical and physical data
- Formula: C_{16}H_{22}N_{4}O_{4}S
- Molar mass: 366.44 g·mol^{−1}
- 3D model (JSmol): Interactive image
- SMILES: CC1=NC=C(C(=N1)N)CN(C=O)/C(=C(/CCOC(=O)C)\SC(=O)C)/C
- InChI: InChI=1S/C16H22N4O4S/c1-10(15(25-13(4)23)5-6-24-12(3)22)20(9-21)8-14-7-18-11(2)19-16(14)17/h7,9H,5-6,8H2,1-4H3,(H2,17,18,19)/b15-10-; Key:ISIPQAHMLLFSFR-GDNBJRDFSA-N

Acetiamine, also known as O,S-diacetylthiamine, is a small molecule drug.

It is a fat-soluble open ring derivative of thiamine (vitamin B_{1}). It is prepared by first treating thiamine with base to produce the ring-opened thiol-type vitamin B_{1} followed by acetylation using acetic anhydride to form the thioester.

Acetiamine is enzymatically cleaved in liver to generate thiamine and acetate. Hence acetiamine is a prodrug of thiamine.

== See also ==
- Vitamin B_{1} analogues
