= Prosultiamine =

Chemical compound

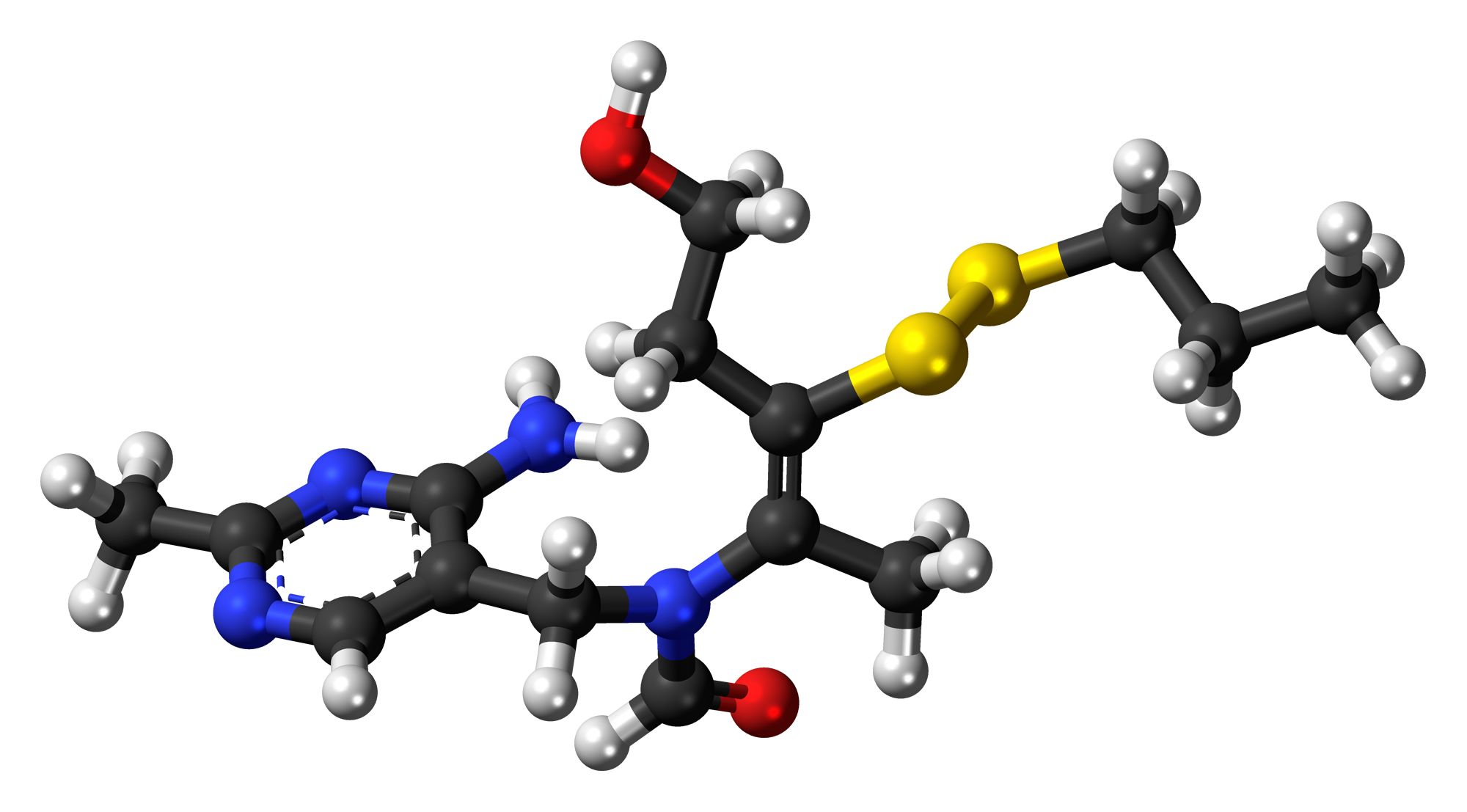

Clinical data
- AHFS/Drugs.com: International Drug Names
- Routes of administration: Oral
- ATC code: None

Legal status
- Legal status: In general: ℞ (Prescription only)

Identifiers
- IUPAC name: N-[(4-amino-2-methylpyrimidin-5-yl)methyl]-N-[(1E)-4-hydroxy-1-methyl-2-(propyldisulfanyl)but-1-en-1-yl]formamide
- CAS Number: 59-58-5
- PubChem CID: 5355019
- ChemSpider: 4511078
- UNII: UI32MM3XE3
- CompTox Dashboard (EPA): DTXSID1046633
- ECHA InfoCard: 100.000.397

Chemical and physical data
- Formula: C_{15}H_{24}N_{4}O_{2}S_{2}
- Molar mass: 356.50 g·mol^{−1}
- 3D model (JSmol): Interactive image
- SMILES: O=CN(\C(=C(\SSCCC)CCO)C)Cc1cnc(nc1N)C

Prosultiamine (INN; also known as thiamine propyl disulfide or TPD; brand name Jubedel,) is a disulfide thiamine derivative discovered in garlic in Japan in the 1950s, and is similar to allithiamine. It was developed as a treatment for vitamin B_{1} deficiency. It has improved lipid solubility relative to thiamine and is not rate-limited by dependency on intestinal transporters for absorption, hence the reasoning for its development.

== Research ==
It has been studied as a potential treatment for infection with human T-lymphotropic virus (HTLV), since it has been shown to reduce viral load and symptoms.

== See also ==
- Vitamin B_{1} analogue
