= Acefurtiamine =

Chemical compound

Clinical data
- ATC code: none

Identifiers
- IUPAC name: (3E)-4-{[(4-Amino-2-methylpyrimidin-5-yl)methyl](formyl)amino}-3-[(furan-2-ylcarbonyl)sulfanyl]pent-3-en-1-yl (acetyloxy)acetate
- CAS Number: 10072-48-7
- PubChem CID: 3037171
- ChemSpider: 2300987
- UNII: 6APJ3D1308
- ChEMBL: ChEMBL2104090
- CompTox Dashboard (EPA): DTXSID20864202

Chemical and physical data
- Formula: C_{21}H_{24}N_{4}O_{7}S
- Molar mass: 476.50 g·mol^{−1}
- 3D model (JSmol): Interactive image
- SMILES: O=C(OCC(=O)OCCC(\SC(=O)c1occc1)=C(/N(C=O)Cc2cnc(nc2N)C)C)C
- InChI: InChI=1S/C21H24N4O7S/c1-13(25(12-26)10-16-9-23-14(2)24-20(16)22)18(33-21(29)17-5-4-7-30-17)6-8-31-19(28)11-32-15(3)27/h4-5,7,9,12H,6,8,10-11H2,1-3H3,(H2,22,23,24)/b18-13+; Key:MYBUGVXNAHWTOL-QGOAFFKASA-N

Acefurtiamine (INN) is a vitamin B_{1} analog in a manner similar to the GABAergic activity of the thiamine derivative clomethiazole. It functions as an analgesic agent at sufficient doses.
