= Thiamine-phosphate kinase =

Class of enzymes

Identifiers
- EC no.: 2.7.4.16
- CAS no.: 9068-23-9

Databases
- IntEnz: IntEnz view
- BRENDA: BRENDA entry
- ExPASy: NiceZyme view
- KEGG: KEGG entry
- MetaCyc: metabolic pathway
- PRIAM: profile
- PDB structures: RCSB PDB PDBe PDBsum
- Gene Ontology: AmiGO / QuickGO
Search
- PMC: articles
- PubMed: articles
- NCBI: proteins

Thiamine-phosphate kinase (EC 2.7.4.16) is an enzyme that catalyzes the chemical reaction

thiamine monophosphate
ATP
ADP
ATP
ADP
thiamine pyrophosphate

The enzyme characterised from Escherichia coli converts thiamine monophosphate to thiamine pyrophosphate by transferring a phosphate group from the cofactor, adenosine triphosphate (ATP), which is converted to adenosine diphosphate (ADP).

== Nomenclature ==
The enzyme is a transferase, specifically onee transferring phosphorus-containing groups (phosphotransferases) with a phosphate group as acceptor. The systematic name of this enzyme class is ATP:thiamine-phosphate phosphotransferase. Other names in common use include thiamin-monophosphate kinase, thiamin monophosphatase, and thiamin monophosphokinase.

== Structural studies ==
As of late 2007, only one structure has been solved for this class of enzymes, with the PDB accession code PDB: 1VQV.
