= Octotiamine =

Chemical compound

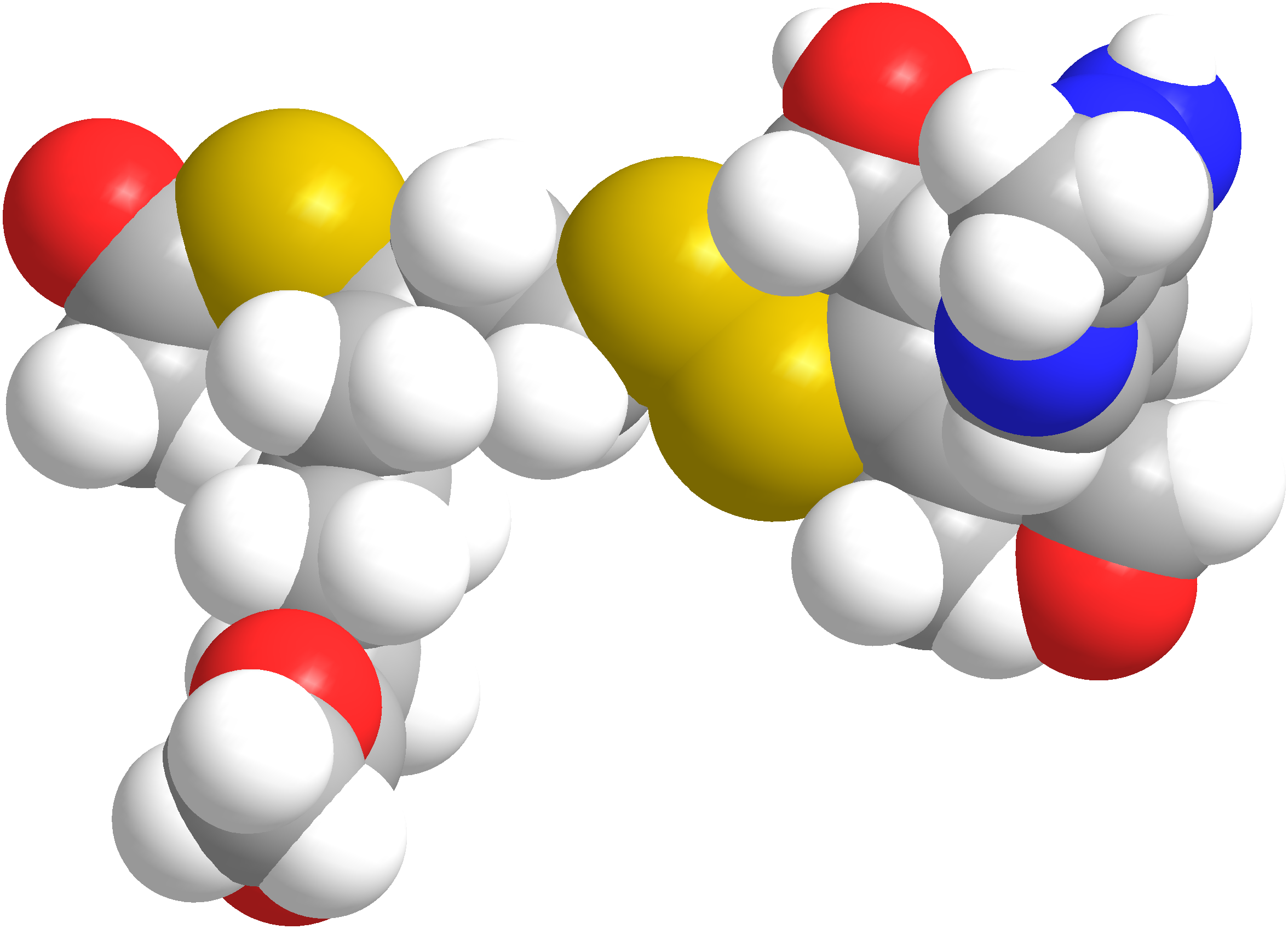

Clinical data
- ATC code: None

Identifiers
- IUPAC name: methyl 6-(acetylsulfanyl)-8-{[(2E)-2-{[(4-amino-2-methyl-5-pyrimidinyl)methyl](formyl)amino}-5-hydroxy-2-penten-3-yl]disulfanyl}octanoate
- CAS Number: 137-86-0
- PubChem CID: 3034020
- ChemSpider: 2298574
- UNII: UN1Q7096GA
- CompTox Dashboard (EPA): DTXSID3057640

Chemical and physical data
- Formula: C_{23}H_{36}N_{4}O_{5}S_{3}
- Molar mass: 544.74 g·mol^{−1}
- 3D model (JSmol): Interactive image
- SMILES: Cc1ncc(c(n1)N)CN(C=O)/C(=C(\CCO)/SSCCC(CCCCC(=O)OC)SC(=O)C)/C
- InChI: InChI=1S/C23H36N4O5S3/c1-16(27(15-29)14-19-13-25-17(2)26-23(19)24)21(9-11-28)35-33-12-10-20(34-18(3)30)7-5-6-8-22(31)32-4/h13,15,20,28H,5-12,14H2,1-4H3,(H2,24,25,26)/b21-16+; Key:VJTXQHYNRDGLON-LTGZKZEYSA-N

Octotiamine (INN, JAN; Gerostop, Neuvita, Neuvitan), also known as thioctothiamine, is an analogue of vitamin B_{1} which is used in Japan and Finland.

== See also ==
- Vitamin B_{1} analogue
