= Thiamine-phosphate diphosphorylase =

Class of enzymes

thiamin-phosphate diphosphorylase

Identifiers
- EC no.: 2.5.1.3
- CAS no.: 9030-30-2

Databases
- BRENDA: enzyme data
- ExPASy: NiceZyme view
- KEGG: enzyme entry
- MetaCyc: metabolic pathway
- Rhea: reactions
- PDB structures: RCSB PDB PDBe PDBsum
- Gene Ontology: AmiGO / QuickGO
Search
- PMC: articles
- PubMed: articles
- NCBI: proteins

In enzymology, a thiamine-phosphate diphosphorylase ( or, thiamine-phosphate pyrophosphorylase ) (EC 2.5.1.3) is an enzyme that catalyzes the chemical reaction

4-Amino-5-hydroxymethyl-2-methylpyrimidine diphosphate + 4-methyl-5-(2-phosphono-oxyethyl)thiazole $\rightleftharpoons$ diphosphate + thiamine monophosphate

The two substrates of this enzyme are 4-Amino-5-hydroxymethyl-2-methylpyrimidine diphosphate and 4-methyl-5-(2-phosphono-oxyethyl)thiazole; its two products are diphosphate and thiamine monophosphate.

This enzyme belongs to the family of transferases, specifically those transferring aryl or alkyl groups other than methyl groups. This enzyme is on the biosynthetic pathway to thiamine.

== Nomenclature ==
The systematic name of this enzyme class is 2-methyl-4-amino-5-hydroxymethylpyrimidine-diphosphate:4-methyl-5-(2 -phosphoethyl)thiazole 2-methyl-4-aminopyrimidine-5-methenyltransferase. Other names in common use include

- thiamine phosphate synthase,
- thiamine phosphate pyrophosphorylase,
- thiamine monophosphate pyrophosphorylase, and
- TMP-PPase.

== Structural studies ==
As of late 2007, 9 structures have been solved for this class of enzymes, with PDB accession codes PDB: 1G4E, PDB: 1G4P, PDB: 1G4S, PDB: 1G4T, PDB: 1G67, PDB: 1G69, PDB: 1G6C, PDB: 1XI3, and PDB: 2TPS.

There are two main structural/evolutional families of proteins that exhibit this activity, both singular protein domains. ThiE (InterPro: IPR034291) is found in most bacteria, some protozoans, plants, and fungi. ThiN (InterPro: IPR019293) is found in archaea and some thermophilic bacteria. The latter also has noncatalytic versions that acts, as a thiamine sensor.
