= Gerrit Grijns =

Dutch researcher (1865–1944)

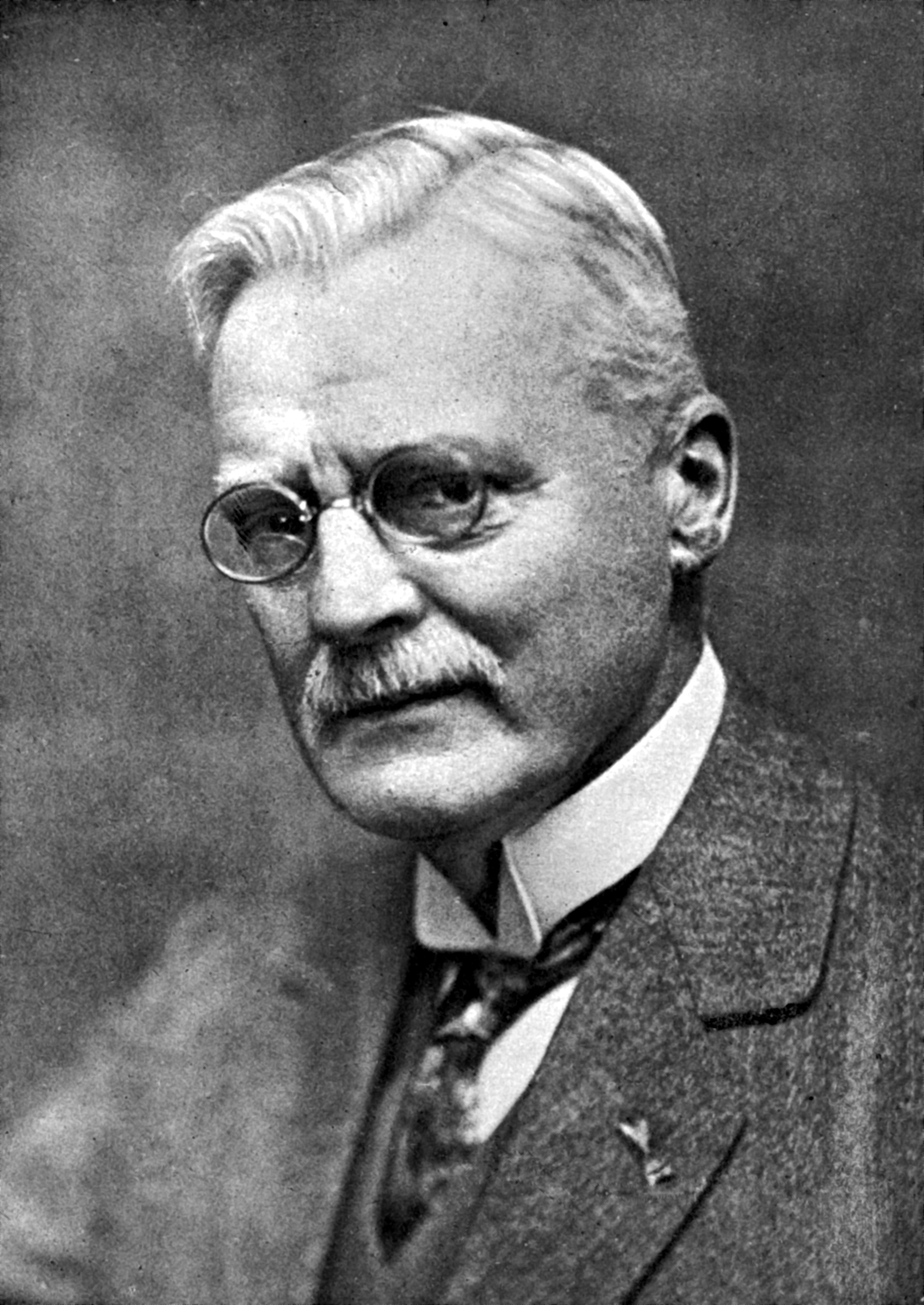
- Gerrit Grijns
- Born: 28 May 1865; Leerdam, the Netherlands
- Died: 11 November 1944 (aged 79); Utrecht, the Netherlands
- Known for: Beriberi, Vitamins
- Scientific career
- Fields: Physiology

Gerrit Grijns (May 28, 1865 – November 11, 1944), was a Dutch researcher and co-discoverer of vitamin B1 (thiamine) as the successor to the later Nobel Prize winner Christiaan Eijkman.

It was Eijkman who in the former Dutch East Indies was the first to associate the deficiency disease beriberi with the lack of the outer membrane in machine-peeled rice. Eijkman fell ill and returned to Europe. His successor Grijns believed that the membrane contains a substance that is indispensable for a healthy metabolism. By writing of "partial hunger" and "protective substance" in 1901, Grijns anticipated the concept of vitamins.

In 1917 Grijns had to leave the Dutch East Indies for health reasons. After returning to the Netherlands, Grijns became in 1921 professor of animal physiology at Landbouwhogeschool Wageningen, currently Wageningen University, where he taught and conducted research until 1935. From 1929-1930 he was Rector Magnificus of the Landbouwhogeschool Wageningen.

On 28 May 1924, Grijns became a member of the Royal Netherlands Academy of Arts and Sciences. Grijns was nominated in 1926 and 1927 for the Nobel Prize for medicine together with Eijkman. When Eijkman (and Frederick Hopkins) received the prize in 1929, Grijns was passed over.
