= Thiamine diphosphokinase =

Class of enzymes

Identifiers
- EC no.: 2.7.6.2
- CAS no.: 9026-24-8

Databases
- IntEnz: IntEnz view
- BRENDA: BRENDA entry
- ExPASy: NiceZyme view
- KEGG: KEGG entry
- MetaCyc: metabolic pathway
- PRIAM: profile
- PDB structures: RCSB PDB PDBe PDBsum
- Gene Ontology: AmiGO / QuickGO
Search
- PMC: articles
- PubMed: articles
- NCBI: proteins

Thiamine diphosphokinase (EC 2.7.6.2) is an enzyme that catalyzes the chemical reaction

thiamine
ATP
AMP
ATP
AMP
thiamine pyrophosphate

The enzyme characterised from rat liver and yeast converts thiamine to thiamine pyrophosphate by transferring a pyrophosphate group from the cofactor, adenosine triphosphate (ATP), which is converted to adenosine monophosphate (AMP).

This enzyme is a transferase, specifically one transferring two phosphorus-containing groups (diphosphotransferases). The systematic name of this enzyme class is ATP:thiamine diphosphotransferase. Other names in common use include thiamin kinase, thiamine pyrophosphokinase, ATP:thiamin pyrophosphotransferase, thiamin pyrophosphokinase, thiamin pyrophosphotransferase, thiaminokinase, thiamin:ATP pyrophosphotransferase, and TPTase.

== Structural studies ==
As of late 2007, six structures have been solved for this class of enzymes, with PDB accession codes PDB: 1IG0, PDB: 1IG3, PDB: 2F17, PDB: 2G9Z, PDB: 2HH9, and PDB: 2OMK.
