= Fursultiamine =

Chemical compound

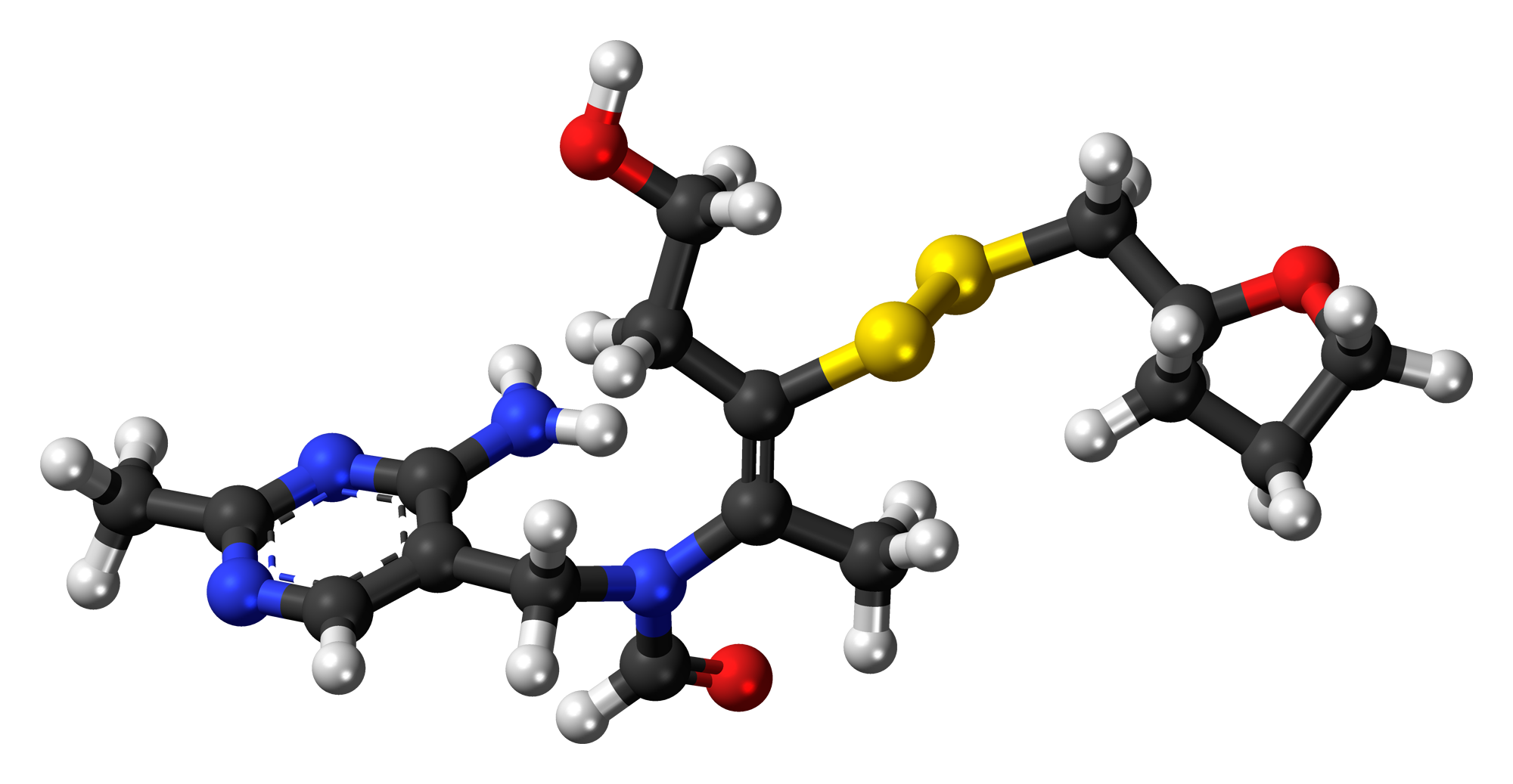

Clinical data
- AHFS/Drugs.com: International Drug Names
- Routes of administration: Oral
- ATC code: None

Legal status
- Legal status: In general: Over-the-counter (OTC)

Identifiers
- IUPAC name: N-[(4-Amino-2-methylpyrimidin-5-yl)methyl]-N-{(1E)-4-hydroxy-1-methyl-2-[(tetrahydrofuran-2-ylmethyl)disulfanyl]but-1-en-1-yl}formamide
- CAS Number: 804-30-8
- PubChem CID: 3002119
- DrugBank: DB08966
- ChemSpider: 2273321
- UNII: 05J61265PX
- ChEMBL: ChEMBL1740659
- CompTox Dashboard (EPA): DTXSID0023084
- ECHA InfoCard: 100.011.234

Chemical and physical data
- Formula: C_{17}H_{26}N_{4}O_{3}S_{2}
- Molar mass: 398.54 g·mol^{−1}
- 3D model (JSmol): Interactive image
- SMILES: O=CN(\C(=C(\SSCC1OCCC1)CCO)C)Cc2cnc(nc2N)C

Fursultiamine (INN; chemical name thiamine tetrahydrofurfuryl disulfide or TTFD; brand names Adventan, Alinamin-F, Benlipoid, Bevitol Lipophil, Judolor, Lipothiamine) is a medication and vitamin used to treat thiamine deficiency. Chemically, it is a tetrahydrofurfuryl disulfide derivative of thiamine and is similar in structure to allithiamine.

It was synthesized in Japan in the 1960s from allithiamine for the purpose of developing forms of thiamine with improved lipophilicity for treating vitamin B_{1} deficiency (i.e., beriberi), It was subsequently commercialized not only in Japan but also in Spain, Austria, Germany, and the United States.

== See also ==
- Vitamin B_{1} analogue
