= Adenosine thiamine diphosphate =

Names
- Systematic IUPAC name (2^{2}R,2^{3}S,2^{4}R,2^{5}R)-1^{6},13^{4}-Diamino-2^{3},2^{4},5,7-tetrahydroxy-11^{4},13^{2}-dimethyl-5,7-dioxo-4,6,8-trioxa-5λ^{5},7λ^{5}-diphospha-11^{3}λ^{5}-1(9)-purina-13(5)-pyrimidina-11(5,3)-[1,3]thiazola-2(2,5)-oxolanatridecaphan-11^{3}-ylium

Identifiers
3D model (JSmol)	acid: Interactive image
PubChem CID	acid: 53481915
- InChI: InChI=1S/C22H29N9O10P2S/c1-11-15(44-10-30(11)6-13-5-25-12(2)29-19(13)23)3-4-38-42(34,35)41-43(36,37)39-7-14-17(32)18(33)22(40-14)31-9-28-16-20(24)26-8-27-21(16)31/h5,8-10,14,17-18,22,32-33H,3-4,6-7H2,1-2H3,(H5-,23,24,25,26,27,29,34,35,36,37)/p+1/t14-,17+,18+,22-/m1/s1 Key: YLSJMTRFGUMRTH-HPXJRWHBSA-O
- SMILES: acid: CC1=C(SC=[N+]1CC2=CN=C(N=C2N)C)CCOP(=O)(O)OP(=O)(O)OC[C@@H]3[C@@H]([C@@H]([C@@H](O3)N4C=NC5=C(N=CN=C54)N)O)O

Properties
Chemical formula	C_{22}H_{28}N_{9}O_{10}P_{2}S^{−}
Molar mass	674.50 g/mol
- Except where otherwise noted, data are given for materials in their standard state (at 25 °C [77 °F], 100 kPa). verify (what is ?) Infobox references

Adenosine thiamine diphosphate (AThDP), or thiaminylated adenosine diphosphate (ADP) is a naturally occurring thiamine adenine nucleotide. It was chemically synthesized and exists in small amounts in vertebrate liver. Its biological significance remains unknown.

== See also ==
- Adenosine thiamine triphosphate
