= Sulfur carrier protein ThiS adenylyltransferase =

Identifiers
- EC no.: 2.7.7.73

Databases
- IntEnz: IntEnz view
- BRENDA: BRENDA entry
- ExPASy: NiceZyme view
- KEGG: KEGG entry
- MetaCyc: metabolic pathway
- PRIAM: profile
- PDB structures: RCSB PDB PDBe PDBsum
Search
- PMC: articles
- PubMed: articles
- NCBI: proteins

Sulfur carrier protein ThiS adenylyltransferase (EC 2.7.7.73, thiF (gene)) is an enzyme with systematic name ATP:(ThiS) adenylyltransferase. This enzyme catalyses the following chemical reaction

ATP + [ThiS] $\rightleftharpoons$ diphosphate + adenylyl-[ThiS]

This enzyme binds Zn^{2+}. The enzyme catalyses the adenylation of ThiS, a sulfur carrier protein involved in the biosynthesis of thiamine.
