= Allithiamine =

Chemical compound

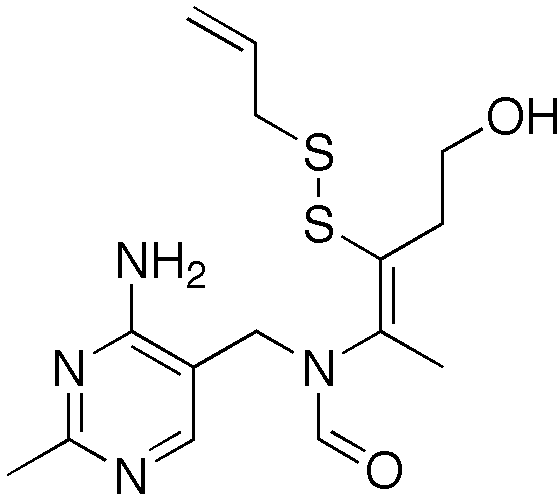

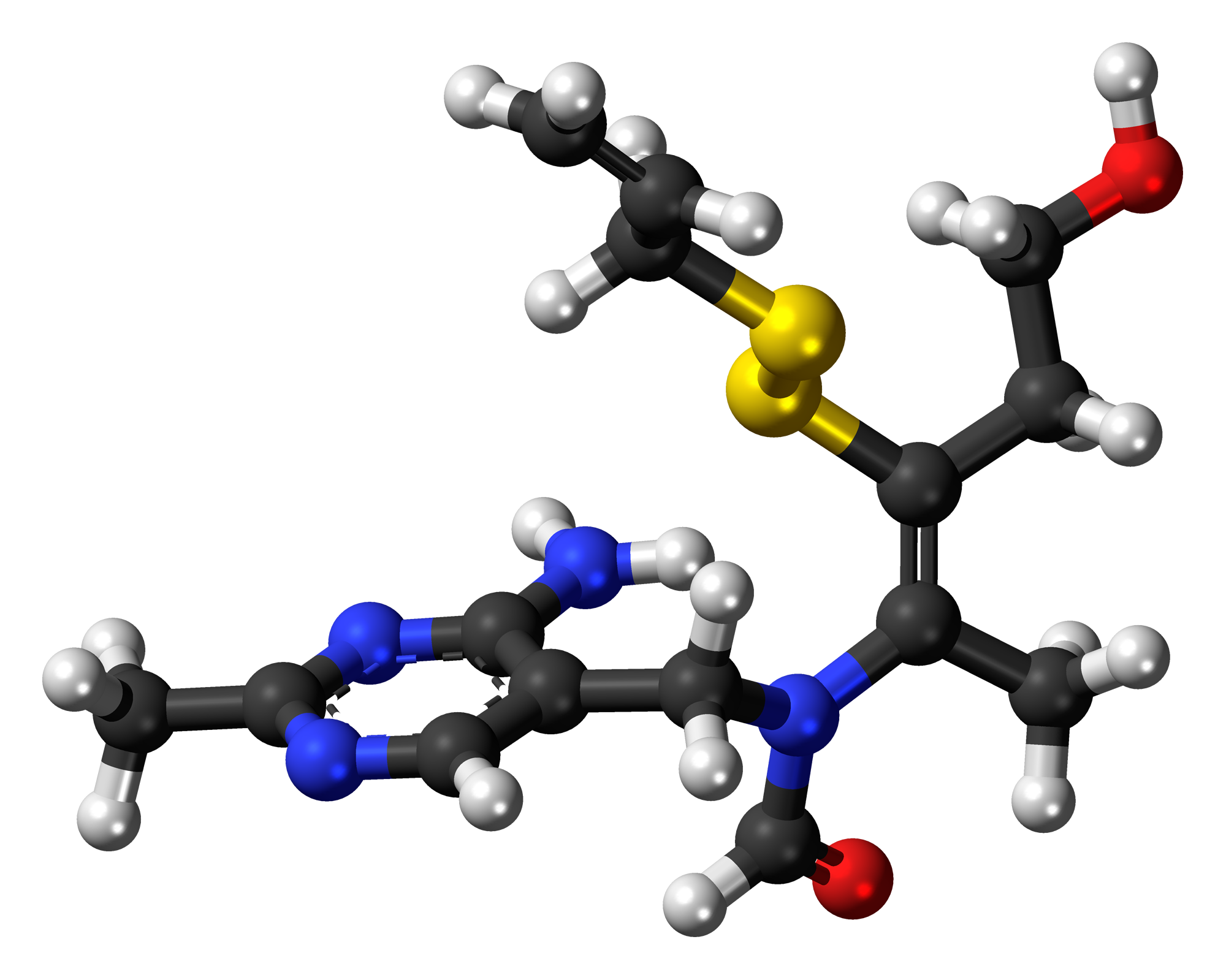

Clinical data
- ATC code: None

Identifiers
- IUPAC name: N-[(4-Amino-2-methylpyrimidin-5-yl)methyl]-N-[(1Z)-4-hydroxy-1-methyl-2-(prop-2-en-1-yldisulfanyl)but-1-en-1-yl]formamide
- CAS Number: 554-44-9
- PubChem CID: 3037212
- ChemSpider: 2301021
- UNII: 83SWN21920

Chemical and physical data
- Formula: C_{15}H_{22}N_{4}O_{2}S_{2}
- Molar mass: 354.49 g·mol^{−1}
- 3D model (JSmol): Interactive image
- SMILES: O=CN(/C(=C(\SSC\C=C)CCO)C)Cc1cnc(nc1N)C
- InChI: InChI=1S/C15H22N4O2S2/c1-4-7-22-23-14(5-6-20)11(2)19(10-21)9-13-8-17-12(3)18-15(13)16/h4,8,10,20H,1,5-7,9H2,2-3H3,(H2,16,17,18)/b14-11-; Key:WNCAVNGLACHSRZ-KAMYIIQDSA-N

Allithiamine (thiamine allyl disulfide or TAD) is a lipid-soluble derivative of vitamin B_{1} which was discovered in garlic (Allium sativum) in the 1950s along with its homolog prosultiamine. They were both investigated for their ability to treat Wernicke–Korsakoff syndrome and beriberi better than thiamine.

== See also ==
- Vitamin B_{1} analogue
