= Hydroxymethylpyrimidine kinase =

Identifiers
- EC no.: 2.7.1.49
- CAS no.: 9026-55-5

Databases
- IntEnz: IntEnz view
- BRENDA: BRENDA entry
- ExPASy: NiceZyme view
- KEGG: KEGG entry
- MetaCyc: metabolic pathway
- PRIAM: profile
- PDB structures: RCSB PDB PDBe PDBsum
- Gene Ontology: AmiGO / QuickGO
Search
- PMC: articles
- PubMed: articles
- NCBI: proteins

Hydroxymethylpyrimidine kinase (EC 2.7.1.49) is an enzyme that catalyzes the chemical reaction

ATP +
toxopyrimidine
ADP +
4-amino-2-methyl-5-phosphooxymethylpyrimidine

The enzyme characterised from baker's yeast converts toxopyrimidine to 4-amino-2-methyl-5-phosphooxymethylpyrimidine by transferring a phosphate group from the cofactor, adenosine triphosphate (ATP), which is converted to adenosine diphosphate (ADP). This reaction is a step in the biosynthesis of thiamine (vitamin B_{1}).

Thiamine

This enzyme is a transferases, specifically one transferring phosphorus-containing groups (phosphotransferases) with an alcohol group as acceptor. The systematic name of this enzyme class is ATP:4-amino-5-hydroxymethyl-2-methylpyrimidine 5-phosphotransferase. This enzyme is also called hydroxymethylpyrimidine kinase (phosphorylating).
