= ATC code A11 =

ATC code A11 Vitamins is a therapeutic subgroup of the Anatomical Therapeutic Chemical Classification System, a system of alphanumeric codes developed by the World Health Organization (WHO) for the classification of drugs and other medical products. Subgroup A11 is part of the anatomical group A Alimentary tract and metabolism.

Codes for veterinary use (ATCvet codes) can be created by placing the letter Q in front of the human ATC code: for example, QA11.
National versions of the ATC classification may include additional codes not present in this list, which follows the WHO version.

== A11A Multivitamins, combinations ==
=== A11AA Multivitamins with minerals ===
A11AA01 Multivitamins and iron
A11AA02 Multivitamins and calcium
A11AA03 Multivitamins and other minerals, including combinations
A11AA04 Multivitamins and trace elements

== A11C Vitamin A and D, including combinations of the two ==
=== A11CA Vitamin A, plain ===
A11CA01 Retinol (vitamin A)
A11CA02 Betacarotene

=== A11CC Vitamin D and analogues ===
A11CC01 Ergocalciferol
A11CC02 Dihydrotachysterol
A11CC03 Alfacalcidol
A11CC04 Calcitriol
A11CC05 Colecalciferol
A11CC06 Calcifediol
A11CC20 Combinations
A11CC55 Colecalciferol, combinations

== A11D Vitamin B_{1}, plain and in combination with vitamin B_{6} and B_{12} ==
=== A11DA Vitamin B_{1}, plain ===
A11DA01 Thiamine (vitamin B_{1})
A11DA02 Sulbutiamine
A11DA03 Benfotiamine

== A11G Ascorbic acid (vitamin C), including combinations ==
=== A11GA Ascorbic acid (vitamin C), plain ===
A11GA01 Ascorbic acid (vitamin C)

=== A11GB Ascorbic acid (vitamin C), combinations ===
A11GB01 Ascorbic acid (vitamin C) and calcium

== A11H Other plain vitamin preparations ==
=== A11HA Other plain vitamin preparations ===
A11HA01 Nicotinamide
A11HA02 Pyridoxine (vitamin B_{6})
A11HA03 Tocopherol (vitamin E)
A11HA04 Riboflavin (vitamin B_{2})
A11HA05 Biotin
A11HA06 Pyridoxal phosphate
A11HA07 Inositol
A11HA08 Tocofersolan
A11HA30 Dexpanthenol
A11HA31 Calcium pantothenate
A11HA32 Pantethine
