= Benfotiamine =

Thiamine analogue

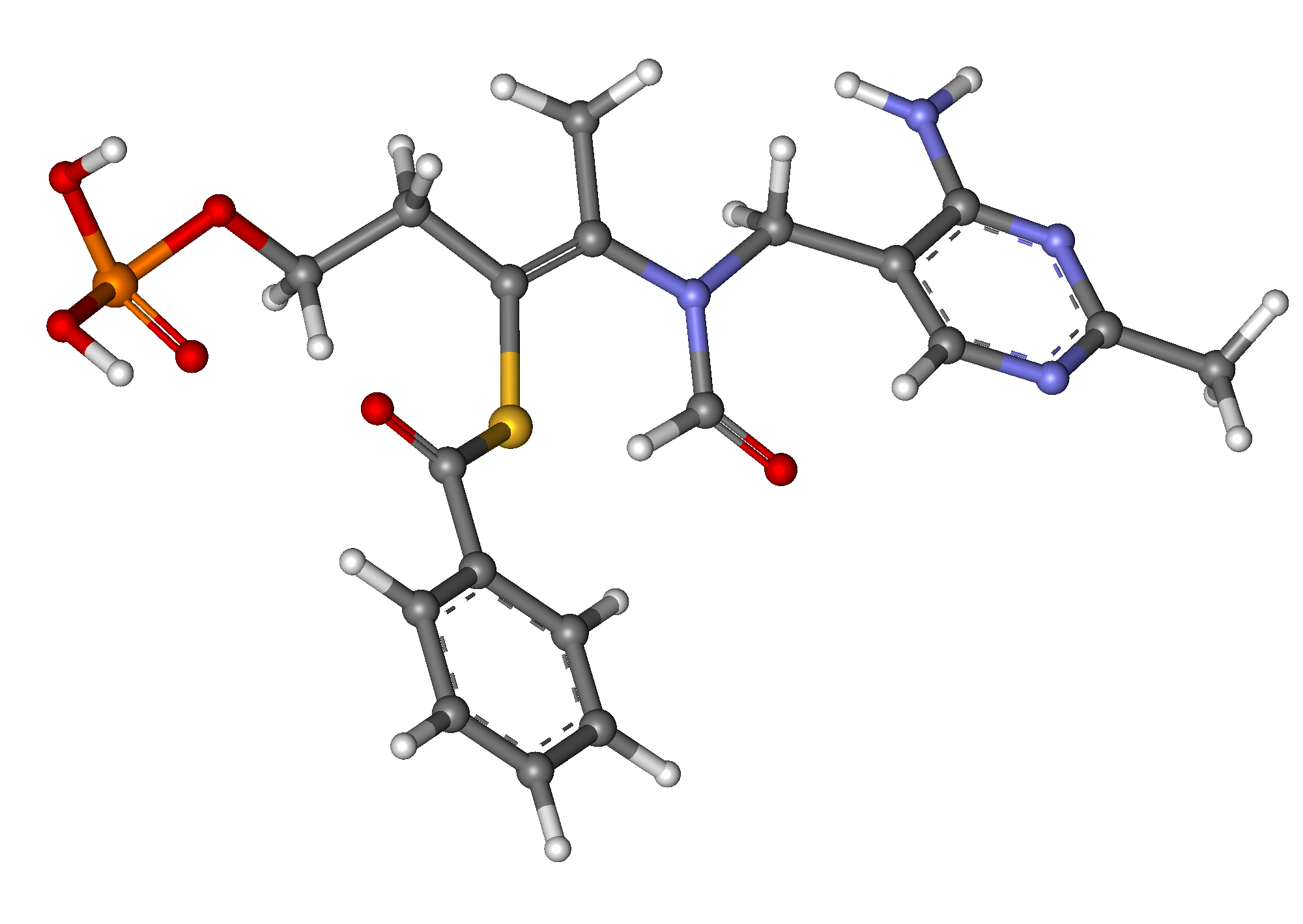

Clinical data
- Other names: S-Benzoylthiamine O-monophosphate
- AHFS/Drugs.com: International Drug Names
- Routes of administration: Oral
- ATC code: A11DA03 (WHO)

Legal status
- Legal status: In general: Over-the-counter (OTC)

Identifiers
- IUPAC name: S-[2-{[(4-Amino-2-methylpyrimidin-5-yl)methyl] (formyl)amino}-5-(phosphonooxy)pent-2-en-3-yl] benzenecarbothioate
- CAS Number: 22457-89-2
- PubChem CID: 3032771
- ChemSpider: 2297665
- UNII: Y92OUS2H9B
- ChEBI: CHEBI:41039
- ChEMBL: ChEMBL1491875
- CompTox Dashboard (EPA): DTXSID3045433
- ECHA InfoCard: 100.040.906

Chemical and physical data
- Formula: C_{19}H_{23}N_{4}O_{6}PS
- Molar mass: 466.45 g·mol^{−1}
- 3D model (JSmol): Interactive image
- SMILES: O=P(O)(O)OCCC(/SC(=O)c1ccccc1)=C(/N(C=O)Cc2cnc(nc2N)C)C
- InChI: InChI=1S/C19H23N4O6PS/c1-13(23(12-24)11-16-10-21-14(2)22-18(16)20)17(8-9-29-30(26,27)28)31-19(25)15-6-4-3-5-7-15/h3-7,10,12H,8-9,11H2,1-2H3,(H2,20,21,22)(H2,26,27,28)/b17-13-; Key:BTNNPSLJPBRMLZ-LGMDPLHJSA-N

Benfotiamine (rINN, or S-benzoylthiamine O-monophosphate) is a synthetic, fat-soluble, S-acyl derivative of thiamine (vitamin B1) that is approved in some countries as a medication or dietary supplement to treat diabetic sensorimotor polyneuropathy. Benfotiamine was developed in the late 1950s in Japan.

== Uses ==
Benfotiamine is primarily marketed as an over-the-counter drug to treat diabetic polyneuropathy. A 2021 review described two clinical trials with positive results for diabetic polyneuropathy and concluded that more research is needed.

As of 2017, benfotiamine was marketed as a pharmaceutical drug in many countries under the following brand names: Benalgis, Benfogamma, Benforce, Benfotiamina, Biotamin, Biotowa, Milgamma, and Vilotram. It was also marketed in some jurisdictions as a combination drug with cyanocobalamin as Milgamma, in combination with pyridoxine as Milgamma, in combination with metformin as Benforce-M, and with thiamine as Vitafos.

== Adverse effects ==
There is little published data on adverse effects. In one study of a combination of benfotiamine, pyridoxine, and cyanocobalamin, around 8% of people taking the drug experienced nausea, dizziness, stomach ache and weight gain.

== Pharmacology ==
Benfotiamine is dephosphorylated to S-benzoylthiamine by ecto-alkaline phosphatases present in the intestinal mucosa, and is then hydrolyzed to thiamine by thioesterases in the liver. Benfotiamine is more bioavailable than thiamine salts, providing higher levels of thiamine in muscle, brain, liver, and kidney.

Benfotiamine mainly acts on peripheral tissues through an increase in transketolase activity.

== Chemistry ==
Benfotiamine is a lipid derivative of thiamine, specifically a synthetic S-acyl Vitamin B_{1} analogue; its chemical name is S-benzoylthiamine O-monophosphate. It has very low solubility in water or other aqueous solvents.

== Research ==
Benfotiamine has been studied in laboratory models of diabetic retinopathy, neuropathy, and nephropathy. A 2021 review of its use for diabetic polyneuropathy described two clinical trials which showed improvements in neuropathic pain and neuropathic symptoms scores, the latter of which showed a dose-response effect. The authors concluded that it could potentially serve as an economical supplement to enhance neuropathy treatment and that more research is needed.

Administration of benfotiamine may increase intracellular levels of thiamine diphosphate, a cofactor of transketolase. Based on metabolic theories of Alzheimer's disease, since thiamine-dependent processes are critical in glucose metabolism and are diminished in brains of Alzheimer's disease patients at autopsy, and since treatment of mouse models of Alzheimer's disease with benfotiamine diminishes plaques, decreases phosphorylation of tau and reverses memory deficits, benfotiamine administration has been proposed as a possible intervention to reverse biological and clinical processes of Alzheimer's disease.

== See also ==
- Vitamin B_{1} analogues
