= Adenosine thiamine triphosphate =

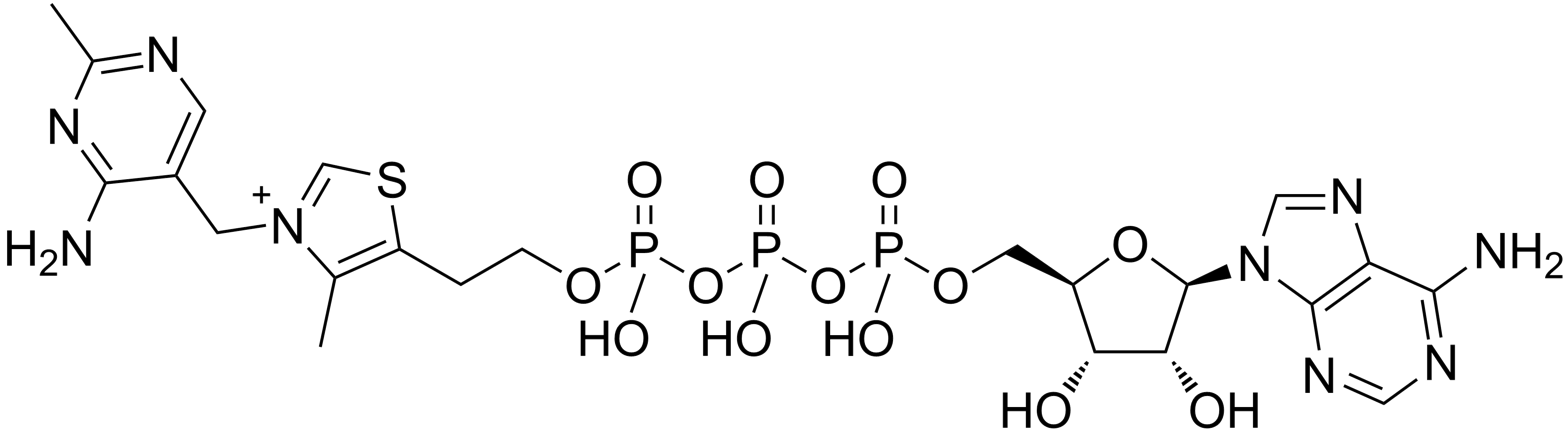

Names
- Systematic IUPAC name (2^{2}R,2^{3}R,2^{4}S,2^{5}R)-1^{6},13^{4}-Diamino-2^{3},2^{4},5,7,9-pentahydroxy-13^{4},15^{2}-dimethyl-5,7,9-trioxo-4,6,8,10-tetraoxa-5λ^{5},7λ^{5},9λ^{5}-triphospha-13^{3}λ^{5}-1(9)-purina-15(5)-pyrimidina-13(5,3)-[1,3]thiazola-2(2,5)-oxolanapentadecaphan-13^{3}-ylium
- Other names P^{1},P^{3}-(Adenosine-5′-thiamine) triphosphate

Identifiers
CAS Number	30632-11-2 (chloride)
3D model (JSmol)	Interactive image; Interactive image
ChEBI	CHEBI:71394
ChemSpider	13082023
MeSH	adenosine+thiamine+triphosphate
PubChem CID	15938962
UNII	9FE2NX8HJW
CompTox Dashboard (EPA)	DTXSID40579927
- InChI: InChI=1S/C22H30N9O13P3S/c1-11-15(48-10-30(11)6-13-5-25-12(2)29-19(13)23)3-4-40-45(34,35)43-47(38,39)44-46(36,37)41-7-14-17(32)18(33)22(42-14)31-9-28-16-20(24)26-8-27-21(16)31/h5,8-10,14,17-18,22,32-33H,3-4,6-7H2,1-2H3,(H6-,23,24,25,26,27,29,34,35,36,37,38,39)/p+1/t14-,17-,18-,22-/m1/s1 Key: FGOYXNBJKMNPDH-SAJUPQAESA-O; InChI=1/C22H30N9O13P3S/c1-11-15(48-10-30(11)6-13-5-25-12(2)29-19(13)23)3-4-40-45(34,35)43-47(38,39)44-46(36,37)41-7-14-17(32)18(33)22(42-14)31-9-28-16-20(24)26-8-27-21(16)31/h5,8-10,14,17-18,22,32-33H,3-4,6-7H2,1-2H3,(H6-,23,24,25,26,27,29,34,35,36,37,38,39)/p+1/t14-,17-,18-,22-/m1/s1 Key: FGOYXNBJKMNPDH-YLNAWJOLBZ
- SMILES: NC1=NC=NC2=C1N=CN2[C@H]3[C@H](O)[C@H](O)[C@@H](COP(OP(OP(OCCC4=C(C)[N+](CC5=CN=C(C)N=C5N)=CS4)(O)=O)(O)=O)(O)=O)O3; O=P(O)(OC[C@H]3O[C@@H](n1c2ncnc(N)c2nc1)[C@H](O)[C@@H]3O)OP(=O)(O)OP(=O)(O)OCCc4sc[n+](c4C)Cc5c(nc(nc5)C)N

Properties
Chemical formula	C_{22}H_{31}N_{9}O_{13}P_{3}S
Molar mass	754.52 g·mol^{−1}
- Except where otherwise noted, data are given for materials in their standard state (at 25 °C [77 °F], 100 kPa). verify (what is ?) Infobox references

Adenosine thiamine triphosphate (AThTP), or thiaminylated adenosine triphosphate, is a natural thiamine adenine nucleotide. It was discovered in Escherichia coli where it may account for up to 15 - 20% of total thiamine under carbon starvation. AThTP also exists in eukaryotic organisms such as yeast, roots of higher plants and animal tissues, albeit at a much lower concentration. It was found to exist in small amounts in the muscle, heart, brain, kidneys and liver of mice.

In E. coli AThTP is synthesized from thiamine diphosphate (ThDP) according to the following reaction catalyzed by thiamine diphosphate adenylyl transferase:

ThDP + ATP (ADP) ↔ AThTP + PP_{i} (P_{i})

== Structure and function ==
The molecule is made up of thiamine and adenosine joined together with phosphate groups. It is similar in structure to NAD+. The function of AThTP is not currently known but it has been shown to inhibit the activity of PARP-1.
