= Thiochrome =

Names
- Other names 2,7-dimethylthiachromine-8-ethanol

Identifiers
CAS Number	92-35-3
3D model (JSmol)	Interactive image
ChemSpider	60072
ECHA InfoCard	100.001.955
EC Number	202-149-9
PubChem CID	66706
UNII	65UT4V5Z34
CompTox Dashboard (EPA)	DTXSID3059052
- InChI: InChI=1S/C12H14N4OS/c1-7-10(3-4-17)18-12-15-11-9(6-16(7)12)5-13-8(2)14-11/h5,17H,3-4,6H2,1-2H3 Key: GTQXMAIXVFLYKF-UHFFFAOYSA-N
- SMILES: CC1=C(SC2=NC3=NC(=NC=C3CN12)C)CCO

Properties
Chemical formula	C_{12}H_{14}N_{4}OS
Molar mass	262.33 g·mol^{−1}
Appearance	yellow solid
Density	1.49 g/cm^{3}
Melting point	228.8 °C (443.8 °F; 501.9 K)
- Except where otherwise noted, data are given for materials in their standard state (at 25 °C [77 °F], 100 kPa). Infobox references

Thiochrome (TChr) is a tricyclic organic compound that arises from the oxidation of the vitamin thiamine. Being highly fluorescent, it is often the derivative that is quantified in the analysis of thiamine. The oxidation can be effected with ceric ammonium nitrate, hydrogen peroxide, and related reagents. Hydrolysis of thiamine can yield a thiol derivative (TSH), which is also susceptible to oxidation to the disulfide (TSST).
