= Pyruvate decarboxylase =

Class of enzymes

- Reaction catalyzed by pyruvate decarboxylase: pyruvate + thiamine pyrophosphate (TPP) → hydroxyethyl-TPP + CO_{2}

Identifiers
- EC no.: 4.1.1.1
- CAS no.: 9001-04-1

Databases
- IntEnz: IntEnz view
- BRENDA: BRENDA entry
- ExPASy: NiceZyme view
- KEGG: KEGG entry
- MetaCyc: metabolic pathway
- PRIAM: profile
- PDB structures: RCSB PDB PDBe PDBsum
- Gene Ontology: AmiGO / QuickGO
Search
- PMC: articles
- PubMed: articles
- NCBI: proteins

Pyruvate decarboxylase is an enzyme (EC 4.1.1.1) that catalyses the decarboxylation of pyruvic acid to acetaldehyde. It is also called 2-oxo-acid carboxylase, alpha-ketoacid carboxylase, and pyruvic decarboxylase. In anaerobic conditions, this enzyme participates in the fermentation process that occurs in yeast, especially of the genus Saccharomyces, to produce ethanol by fermentation. It is also present in some species of fish (including goldfish and carp) where it permits the fish to perform ethanol fermentation (along with lactic acid fermentation) when oxygen is scarce. Pyruvate decarboxylase starts this process by converting pyruvate into acetaldehyde and carbon dioxide. Pyruvate decarboxylase depends on cofactors thiamine pyrophosphate (TPP) and magnesium. This enzyme should not be mistaken for the unrelated enzyme pyruvate dehydrogenase, an oxidoreductase (EC 1.2.4.1), that catalyzes the oxidative decarboxylation of pyruvate to acetyl-CoA.

== Structure ==
Pyruvate decarboxylase occurs as a dimer of dimers with two active sites shared between the monomers of each dimer. The enzyme contains a beta-alpha-beta structure, yielding parallel beta-sheets. It contains 563 residue subunits in each dimer; the enzyme has strong intermonomer attractions, but the dimers loosely interact to form a loose tetramer.

Crystallographic structures of pyruvate decarboxylase
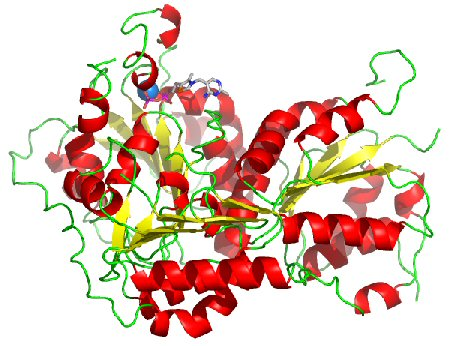
Cartoon diagram of pyruvate decarboxylase monomer with TPP attached.

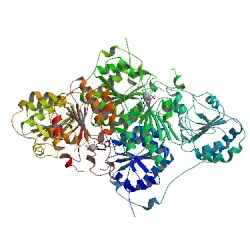
Cartoon diagram of pyruvate decarboxylase tetramer.

Active site of pyruvate decarboxylase with selected amino acids: Glu-51, Glu-477, Asp-444, and Asp-28. Also displayed are cofactors TPP and Mg^{2+}.

Positions of His and Cys residues in respect to active site (TPP and Mg) that participate in conformation changes when interacting with pyruvate substrate.

=== Active site residues ===
Each active site has 20 amino acid residues, including the acidic Glu-477, which interacts with the TPP ring, and Glu-51, which participates with the binding of the cofactor. These glutamates also stabilize the ylid of TPP, acting as proton donors. The nonpolar environment around this Glu 477 is nonpolar, which contributes to a higher than normal pK_{a} (normal Glu and Asp pKa's are around 4.6 in small proteins).

The lipophilic residues Ile-476, Ile-480 and Pro-26 contribute to the nonpolarity of the area around Glu-477. The only other negatively charged residue apart from TPP coenzyme is the Asp-28, which also aids in increasing the pK_{a} of Glu-477. Thus, the environment of the enzyme must allow for the protonation of the gamma-carboxyl group of Glu-477 to be around pH 6.

The aminopyrimidine ring on TPP acts as a base, once in its imine form, to pull off the C2 proton from TPP to form the nucleophile ylide. This must occur because the enzyme has no basic side chains present to deprotonate the TPP C2. A mutation at the active site involving these Glu can result in the inefficiency or inactivity of the enzyme. This inactivity has been proven in experiments in which either the N1' and/or 4'-amino groups are missing. In NMR analysis, it has been determined that when TPP is bound to the enzyme along with the substrate-analog pyruvamide, the rate of ylid formation is greater than the normal enzyme rate. Also, the rate of mutation of Glu 51 to Gln reduces this rate significantly.

Residues Asp-444 and Asp-28 bind Mg^{2+}. Two Cys-221 (more than 20 Ångstroms away from each site) and His-92 trigger a conformational change, which inhibits or activates the enzyme depending on the substrate availability. If the substrate bound in the active site is pyruvate, the enzyme is activated by a conformational change in this regulatory site. The conformational change involves a 1,2 nucleophilic addition. This reaction, the formation of a thioketal, transforms the enzyme from its inactive to active state.

Inhibition of the site is done by a XC_{6}H_{4}CH=CHCOCOOH class of inhibitors/substrate analogues, as well as by the product of decarboxylation from such compounds as cinnamaldehydes. Other potential nucleophilic sites for the inhibitor include Cys-152, Asp-28, His-114, His-115, and Gln-477.

The normal catalytic rate of pyruvate decarboxylase is k_{cat} = 10 s^{−1}. However, the rate of the enzyme with a Glu-51 mutation to Gln is 1.7 s^{−1}.

=== TPP prosthetic group ===
The cofactor TPP is the prosthetic group to the enzyme. The CH center located between the sulfur and nitrogen atoms on thiazole ring is acidic. Upon deprotonation, it generates an ylide, and becomes negatively charged as a carbanion. This can react as a nucleophile at the ketone carbon of pyruvic acid. During the decarboxylation of pyruvate, the TPP stabilizes the carbanion intermediates as an electrophile by noncovalent bonds. Specifically, the pyridyl nitrogen N1' and the 4'-amino group of TPP are essential for the catalytic function of the enzyme-TPP complex.

== Mechanism ==

The enzyme splits pyruvate into carbon dioxide and acetaldehyde. The reaction proceeds by attack of the nucleophilic thiazole carbon on the keto group. The intermediate loses carbon dioxide, giving an enol, in an irreversible step. Subsequently, free acetaldehyde is released and the TPP is regenerated.

== Yeast ==
In yeast, pyruvate decarboxylase acts independently during anaerobic fermentation and releases the 2-carbon fragment as acetaldehyde plus carbon dioxide. Pyruvate decarboxylase creates the means of CO_{2} elimination, which the cell dispels. The enzyme is also means to create ethanol, which is used as an antibiotic to eliminate competing organisms. The enzyme is necessary to help the decarboxylation of alpha-keto acids because there is a build-up of negative charge that occurs on the carbonyl carbon atom in the transition state; therefore, the enzyme provides the suitable environment for TPP and the alpha-keto acid (pyruvate) to meet.
