= Thiamine monophosphate =

Identifiers
CAS Number	10023-48-0
3D model (JSmol)	Interactive image
ChEBI	CHEBI:9533
ChemSpider	10307
ECHA InfoCard	100.007.762
MeSH	Thiamine+Monophosphate
PubChem CID	10761
UNII	71F2V60NN0
CompTox Dashboard (EPA)	DTXSID6046397
- InChI: InChI=1S/C12H17N4O4PS.ClH/c1-8-11(3-4-20-21(17,18)19)22-7-16(8)6-10-5-14-9(2)15-12(10)13;/h5,7H,3-4,6H2,1-2H3,(H3-,13,14,15,17,18,19);1H Key: GUGWNSHJDUEHNJ-UHFFFAOYSA-N; InChI=1/C12H17N4O4PS.ClH/c1-8-11(3-4-20-21(17,18)19)22-7-16(8)6-10-5-14-9(2)15-12(10)13;/h5,7H,3-4,6H2,1-2H3,(H3-,13,14,15,17,18,19);1H Key: GUGWNSHJDUEHNJ-UHFFFAOYAK
- SMILES: Cc1c(sc[n+]1Cc2cnc(nc2N)C)CCOP(=O)(O)O.[Cl-]

Properties
Chemical formula	C_{12}H_{18}N_{4}O_{4}PS+
Molar mass	345.336 g/mol
- Except where otherwise noted, data are given for materials in their standard state (at 25 °C [77 °F], 100 kPa). verify (what is ?) Infobox references

Thiamine monophosphate, also known as ThMP and TMP, is a phosphate ester of thiamine.

It is an intermediate from the hydrolysis of thiamine diphosphate to free thiamine by alkaline phosphatase. The conversion of ThMP to thiamine cannot be facilitated by acid hydrolysis. ThMP is also enzymatically synthesized by thiamine-phosphate pyrophosphorylase, which combines thiazole in its monophosphate form and pyrimidine as a pyrophosphate.

The physiological function of ThMP has not been identified.

== Physiological presence ==
In whole human blood, both ThMP and free thiamine are present in lower concentrations as compared to TPP, but they are found in low amounts in plasma. ThMP is the only phosphorylated thiamine derivative found in human cerebral spinal fluid.

It occurs naturally in bovine milk.

In rats, approximately 64% of the total thiamine in plasma exists in its the monophosphate form. After injection of ThMP into the femoral vein of rats, it was quickly transported to the cerebral tissue without chemical modification, but the average transport rate was 5-10 times slower than that of thiamine.
