= Toxopyrimidine =

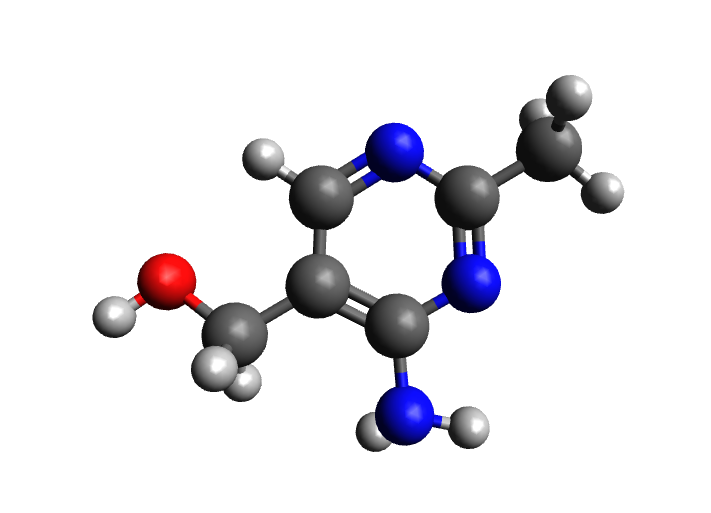

Names
- Preferred IUPAC name (4-Amino-2-methylpyrimidin-5-yl)methanol
- Other names Pyramin

Identifiers
| CAS Number | 73-67-6 |
| 3D model (JSmol) | Interactive image |
| ChemSpider | 756 |
| ECHA InfoCard | 100.234.283 |
| PubChem CID | 777 |
| UNII | G62V17J09J |
| CompTox Dashboard (EPA) | DTXSID80223275 |
- InChI: InChI=1S/C6H9N3O/c1-4-8-2-5(3-10)6(7)9-4/h2,10H,3H2,1H3,(H2,7,8,9) Key: VUTBELPREDJDDH-UHFFFAOYSA-N
- SMILES: Cc1ncc(c(n1)N)CO

Properties
| Chemical formula | C_{6}H_{9}N_{3}O |
| Molar mass | 139.158 g·mol^{−1} |
- Except where otherwise noted, data are given for materials in their standard state (at 25 °C [77 °F], 100 kPa). Infobox references

Toxopyrimidine is a vitamin B_{6} antagonist with potent convulsant effects.

== See also ==
- Crimidine
- Ginkgotoxin
