= Thiamine pyrophosphate =

Names
- IUPAC name 2-[3-[(4-amino-2-methylpyrimidin-5-yl)methyl]-4-methyl-1,3-thiazol-3-ium-5-yl]ethyl phosphono hydrogen phosphate
- Other names Thiamine diphosphate

Identifiers
CAS Number	136-08-3
3D model (JSmol)	Interactive image
ChEBI	CHEBI:9532
ChemSpider	10670483
KEGG	C00068
MeSH	Thiamine+pyrophosphate
PubChem CID	1132
UNII	Q57971654Y
CompTox Dashboard (EPA)	DTXSID2048404
- InChI: InChI=1S/C12H17N4OS.ClH.H4O7P2/c1-8-11(3-4-17)18-7-16(8)6-10-5-14-9(2)15-12(10)13;;1-8(2,3)7-9(4,5)6/h5,7,17H,3-4,6H2,1-2H3,(H2,13,14,15);1H;(H2,1,2,3)(H2,4,5,6)/q+1;;/p-1 Key: NBSUTVXQOGUTJX-UHFFFAOYSA-M; InChI=1/C12H17N4OS.ClH.H4O7P2/c1-8-11(3-4-17)18-7-16(8)6-10-5-14-9(2)15-12(10)13;;1-8(2,3)7-9(4,5)6/h5,7,17H,3-4,6H2,1-2H3,(H2,13,14,15);1H;(H2,1,2,3)(H2,4,5,6)/q+1;;/p-1 Key: NBSUTVXQOGUTJX-REWHXWOFAB
- SMILES: Cc2ncc(C[n+]1csc(CCOP(=O)(O)OP(=O)(O)O)c1C)c(N)n2

Properties
Chemical formula	C_{12}H_{19}N_{4}O_{7}P_{2}S^{+}
Molar mass	425.314382 g/mol
- Except where otherwise noted, data are given for materials in their standard state (at 25 °C [77 °F], 100 kPa). verify (what is ?) Infobox references

Thiamine pyrophosphate (TPP or ThPP), or thiamine diphosphate (ThDP), or cocarboxylase is a thiamine (vitamin B_{1}) derivative which is produced by the enzyme thiamine diphosphokinase. Thiamine pyrophosphate is a cofactor that is present in all living systems, in which it catalyzes several biochemical reactions.

Thiamine pyrophosphate is synthesized in the cytosol and is required in the cytosol for the activity of transketolase and in the mitochondria for the activity of pyruvate-, oxoglutarate- and branched chain keto acid dehydrogenases. To date, the yeast ThPP carrier (Tpc1p) the human Tpc and the Drosophila melanogaster have been identified as being responsible for the mitochondrial transport of ThPP and ThMP. It was first discovered as an essential nutrient (vitamin) in humans through its link with the peripheral nervous system disease beriberi, which results from a deficiency of thiamine in the diet.

TPP works as a coenzyme in many enzymatic reactions, such as:

- Pyruvate dehydrogenase complex
- Pyruvate decarboxylase in ethanol fermentation
- Alpha-ketoglutarate dehydrogenase complex
- Branched-chain amino acid dehydrogenase complex
- 2-hydroxyphytanoyl-CoA lyase
- Transketolase

== Chemistry ==
The "ylide form" of TPP.

Chemically, TPP consists of a pyrimidine ring which is connected to a thiazole ring, which is in turn connected to a pyrophosphate (diphosphate) functional group.

The part of TPP molecule that is most commonly involved in reactions is the thiazole ring, which contains nitrogen and sulfur. Thus, the thiazole ring is the "reagent portion" of the molecule. The C2 of this ring is capable of acting as an acid by donating its proton and forming a carbanion. Normally, reactions that form carbanions are highly unfavorable, but the positive charge on the tetravalent nitrogen just adjacent to the carbanion stabilizes the negative charge, making the reaction much more favorable. A compound with positive and negative charges on adjacent atoms is called an ylide, so sometimes the carbanion form of TPP is referred to as the "ylide form".

== Reaction mechanisms ==
In several reactions, including that of pyruvate dehydrogenase, alpha-ketoglutarate dehydrogenase, and transketolase, TPP catalyzes the reversible decarboxylation reaction (cleavage of a substrate compound at a carbon-carbon bond connecting a carbonyl group to an adjacent reactive group—usually a carboxylic acid or an alcohol). It achieves this in four basic steps:

1. The carbanion of the TPP ylid nucleophilically attacks the carbonyl group on the substrate. (This forms a single bond between the TPP and the substrate.)
2. The target bond on the substrate is broken, and its electrons are pushed towards the TPP. This creates a double bond between the substrate carbon and the TPP carbon and pushes the electrons in the N-C double bond in TPP entirely onto the nitrogen atom, reducing it from a positive to neutral form.
3. In what is essentially the reverse of step two, the electrons push back in the opposite direction forming a new bond between the substrate carbon and another atom. (In the case of the decarboxylases, this creates a new carbon-hydrogen bond. In the case of transketolase, this attacks a new substrate molecule to form a new carbon-carbon bond.)
4. In what is essentially the reverse of step one, the TPP-substrate bond is broken, reforming the TPP ylid and the substrate carbonyl.

The TPP thiazolium ring can be deprotonated at C2 to become an ylid:

A full view of TPP. The arrow indicates the acidic proton.

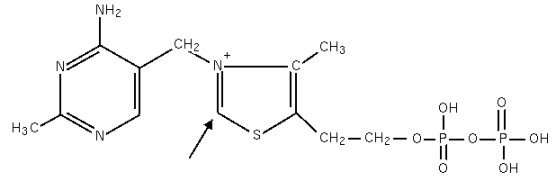

== See also ==
- TPP riboswitch
