= C27H44O3 =

The molecular formula C_{27}H_{44}O_{3} (molar mass: 416.63 g/mol, exact mass: 416.329045) may refer to:

- 1,25-Dihydroxycholecalciferol
- 24,25-Dihydroxycholecalciferol
- Paricalcitol, an analog of vitamin D
- Sarsasapogenin
- Tacalcitol
