= Dihydroxyvitamin D3 =

Dihydroxyvitamin D_{3} may refer to:

- 1,25-Dihydroxycholecalciferol (1,25-dihydroxyvitamin D_{3})
- 24,25-Dihydroxycholecalciferol (24,25-dihydroxyvitamin D_{3})
- Tacalcitol (1,24-dihydroxyvitamin D_{3})
