= Vitamin D receptor modulator =

Group of chemical compounds

Vitamin D receptor modulators (VDRMs) are chemicals that act on the vitamin D receptor (VDR). The natural agonist (activator) of VDR is calcitriol (1,25-dihydroxycholecalciferol, 1,25(OH)_{2}D_{3}) acts on the VDR to exert the many functions of vitamin D, from the "classical" renal and intestinal effects of calcitriol on calcium and phosphate homeostasis to the more recent discoveries of effects on cell proliferation and differentiation in the skin, immune system, and bone cells. The vitamin D analogues (VDAs) are modified versions of the natural vitamin D chemicals used as pharmaceuticals, with a goal of potentially greater, or selective, therapeutic actions.

== Medical uses ==
Calcitriol is used systemically to raise calcium levels and bone density, the "classical" functions of vitamin D drugs. Calcitriol is the active form of vitamin D_{3} normally made in the kidney. Kidney disease could prevent this form from being made, requiring replacement using the already-active form. It is also used systemically to treat psoriasis and psoriatic arthritis, though this has been largely replaced by analogues that have less of the "classical" action on calcium levels. It is also used as an ointment to locally treat psoriasis.

Most VDRMs are developed to reduce the effects on blood calcium and phosphate levels compared to calcitriol, while maintaining or even increasing the other actions. One example is calcipotriol, which can be topically used for psoriasis.

A group of VDAs developed along similar lines of thought are the 1-hydroxyl vitamin Ds . These bypass the need for kidney activation, but

== Mechanism of action ==
=== Background: vitamin D mechanism ===
Regulation and mechanism of action of vitamin D

Vitamin D normally undergoes two steps of activation in the human body to reach the active form (calcitriol): 25-hydroxylation in the liver, followed by 1-hydroxylation in the kidney. Calcitriol is then inactived by CYP24A1 at target organs as needed. Calcitriol exerts its actions on the body by binding to the VDR, causing changes in gene transcription. In the gut, kidney, and bone, VDR activation leads to increases in serum calcium and phosphate levels. VDR activation also decreases the 1-hydroxylation in the kidney and increases CYP24A1 levels, forming a negative feedback control system.

When serum calcium levels are low, the parathyroid gland makes more parathyroid hormone (PTH). When PTH reaches the kidney, it increases 1-hydroxylation activity and decreases CYP24A1 action: through the actions of calcitriol on the gut, kidney, and bone, this leads to normalization of calcium levels. Similarly, when serum phosphate levels are low, the production of FGF-23 in the bone cells are increased, leading to reduced 1-hydroxylation activity and increased CYP24A1. This is the "classical" role of vitamin D, to maintain calcium and phosphate homeostatis.

Vitamin D and its analogues also play a large role in cell proliferation and differentiation in the skin, immune system, and bone cells. Some of these activities happen through the genomic actions of the VDR, while others involve nongenomic actions of either the VDR or another receptor protein known as PDIA3 (MARRS; ERp57/GRp58/ERp60). Non-genomic actions have been identified in the gut, bone, and skin; they are identified by being more rapid than the genomic actions, too fast to be explained by the standard process of gene transcription changes leading to protein production changes.

=== Modifications ===
In people with kidney dysfunction, the loop is disrupted due to reduced 1-hydroxylation. To solve this one approach is to directly supplement the active form, calcitriol. Another approach is to supplement the 1-hydroxylated (but not 25-hydroxylated) inactive forms of alfacalcidol and doxercalciferol. These prodrugs are easily activated in the liver to become the active form, but because they first reach the gut as the inactive molecule, they do not show the oversized effect on gut Ca^{2+} and PO^{−}_{4} handling that calcitriol exhibits when taken orally.

The genomic actions of vitamin D (and analogues) are mediated by a 6-s-trans configuration, while the nongenomic actions are generally mediated by a 6-s-cis configuration. While calcitriol can exist in both configurations, some analogues are intentionally designed to be locked into one of these conformations, affording selectivity in what kind of vitamin D action it has.

24- and 25-hydroxylation both act on the side chain of vitamin D. A number of analogues contain modifications on the side chain to make use of the sensitivity of VDR to modifications.

== Types ==
=== Modifications of the core secosteroid ===
1-hydroxylation:

- Alfacalcidol [1α(OH)D₃]
- Doxercalciferol [1α(OH)D₂]

Attachment of extra unnatural sidechain to ring A: Eldecalcitol [2β-(3-hydroxypropoxy)-1α,25(OH)₂D₃].

Other modification to ring A: Dihydrotachysterol.

Opening of ring C: CD578, WY1112.

=== Modifications of the side chain ===
- Calcipotriol^{#} [22-ene-26,27-dehydro-1α,25(OH)₂D₃]
- Falecalcitriol [26,27-F₆-1α,25(OH)₂D₃]
- Lexicalcitol / KH-1060^{§} [20-epi-22-oxa-24,26,27-trishomo-1α,25(OH)₂D₃]
- Maxacalcitol [22-oxa-1α,25(OH)₂D₃]
- Paricalcitol [19-nor-25(OH)D₂]
- Seocalcitol^{§} [22,24-diene-24,26,27-trishomo-1α,25(OH)₂D₃]
- Tacalcitol^{#} [1α,24(OH)₂D₃]

=== Antagonists ===
VDR antagonists such as ZK159222 and TEI-9647 are developed for research into the actions of the VDR.

== Non-modulator analogues ==
There are also VD analogues without any significant activity on VDR: the enzymes in the pathway may be targeted instead of the receptor. For example, CTA091 (a complicated side chain modification) is highly selective for CYP24A1 inhibition over CYP27B1.

There are also analogues that both activate the VDR and selectively reduce CYP24A1 expression, such as CTA018.

Series	Provitamin	Vitamin	25(OH)	1,25(OH)_{2}
D_{3}	7-Dehydrocholesterol^{§}	Cholecalciferol^{ƒ#}	Calcifediol	Calcitriol^{#}
D_{2}	Ergosterol^{§}	Ergocalciferol^{ƒ#}	Ercalcidiol^{§}	Ercalcitriol^{§}
