= Vitamin D =

Essential nutrient

- Drug class
- Cholecalciferol (D_{3})

Class identifiers
- Synonyms: Calciferols
- Use: Rickets, osteoporosis, osteomalacia, vitamin D deficiency
- ATC code: A11CC
- Biological target: vitamin D receptor

Clinical data
- Drugs.com: MedFacts Natural Products

External links
- MeSH: D014807

Legal status

Vitamin D is a group of structurally related, fat-soluble compounds responsible for increasing intestinal absorption of calcium, along with numerous other biological functions. In humans, the most important compounds within this group are vitamin D_{3} (cholecalciferol) and vitamin D_{2} (ergocalciferol).

Unlike the other twelve vitamins, vitamin D is only conditionally essential in the diet, as with adequate skin exposure to the ultraviolet B (UVB) radiation component of sunlight there is synthesis of cholecalciferol in the deeper layers of the skin's epidermis. Vitamin D can also be obtained through diet, food fortification and dietary supplements. For most people, skin synthesis contributes more than dietary sources. Accordingly, the name "vitamin D" is arguably a misnomer, as rather than being an essential part of the diet, it acts more like a fat-soluble secosteroid hormone precursor. Nevertheless, US and other dietary guidelines generally assume that all of a person's vitamin D is taken orally, given the potential for insufficient sunlight exposure due to urban living, cultural choices for the amount of clothing worn when outdoors, and use of sunscreen because of concerns about safe sunlight exposure. In many countries, milk and plant-based milk substitutes are fortified with vitamin D_{3}, as are breakfast cereals.

Cholecalciferol is converted in the liver to calcifediol (also known as calcidiol or 25-hydroxycholecalciferol), while ergocalciferol is converted to ercalcidiol (25-hydroxyergocalciferol). These two vitamin D metabolites, collectively referred to as 25-hydroxyvitamin D or 25(OH)D, are measured in serum to assess a person's vitamin D status. Calcifediol is further hydroxylated by the kidneys and certain immune cells to form calcitriol (1,25-dihydroxycholecalciferol; 1,25(OH)_{2}D), the biologically active form of vitamin D. Calcitriol attaches to vitamin D receptors, which are nuclear receptors found in various tissues throughout the body. Analogous reactions occur for other vitamin D forms as well as various vitamin D analogues.

The discovery of the vitamin in 1922 was due to an effort to identify the dietary deficiency in children with rickets. Adolf Windaus received the Nobel Prize in Chemistry in 1928 for his work on the constitution of sterols and their connection with vitamins. Present day, government food fortification programs in some countries and recommendations to consume vitamin D supplements are intended to prevent or treat vitamin D deficiency, rickets, and osteomalacia.

To date, investigators have nominally linked many other health conditions to vitamin D deficiency. However, the evidence for health benefits of vitamin D supplementation in individuals who already are vitamin D sufficient is as yet unproven.

== History ==
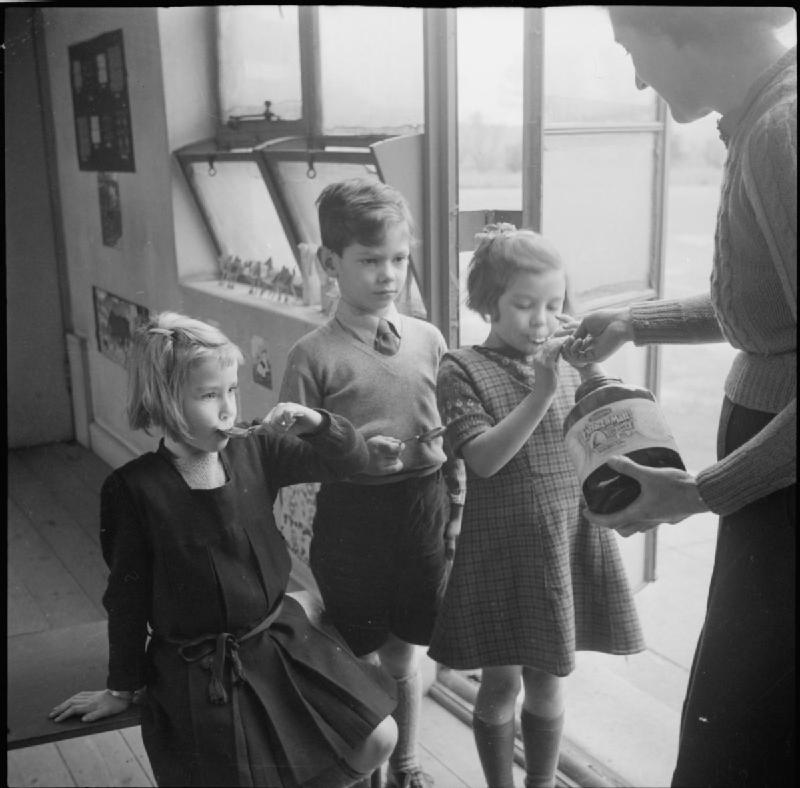
Children being given cod liver oil, Cambridgeshire, England, 1944

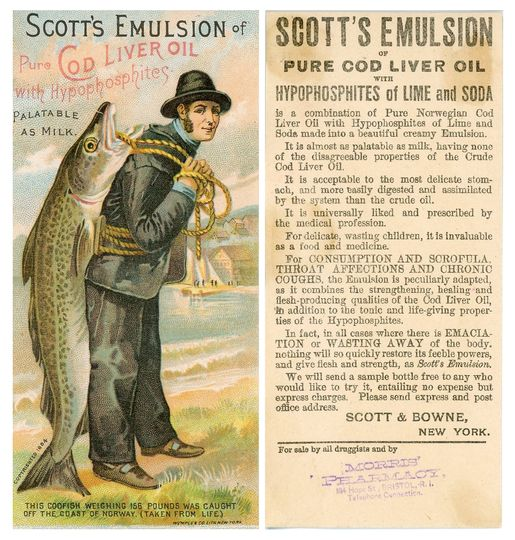
Scott's Emulsion of Pure Cod Liver Oil Trade Card

In northern European countries, cod liver oil had a long history of folklore medical uses, including applied to the skin and taken orally as a treatment for rheumatism and gout. There were several extraction processes. Fresh livers cut to pieces and suspended on screens over pans of boiling water would drip oil that could be skimmed off the water, yielding a pale oil with a mild fish odor and flavor. For industrial purposes such as a lubricant, cod livers were placed in barrels to rot, with the oil skimmed off over months. The resulting oil was light to dark brown, and exceedingly foul smelling and tasting. In the 1800s, cod liver oil became popular as a bottled medicinal product for oral consumption – a teaspoon a day – with both pale and brown oils being used. The trigger for the surge in oral use was the observation made in several European countries—starting with Germany in the 1820s and spreading to other countries into the 1860s—that young children fed cod liver oil did not develop rickets. In northern Europe and the United States, the practice of giving children cod liver oil to prevent rickets persisted well in the 1950s. This overlapped with the fortification of cow's milk with vitamin D, which began in the early 1930s.

Knowledge of cod liver oil being rickets-preventive in humans carried over to treating animals. In 1899, London surgeon John Bland-Sutton was asked to investigate why litters of lion cubs at the London Zoo were dying with a presentation that included rickets. He recommended that the diets of the pregnant and nursing females and the weaned cubs be switched from lean horse meat to goat – including calcium- and phosphorus-containing bones – and cod liver oil, solving the problem. Subsequently, researchers realized that animal models such as dogs and rats could be used for rickets research, leading to the identification and naming of the responsible vitamin in 1922.

In 1914, American researchers Elmer McCollum and Marguerite Davis had discovered a substance in cod liver oil which later was named "vitamin A". Edward Mellanby, a British researcher, observed that dogs that were fed cod liver oil did not develop rickets, and (wrongly) concluded that vitamin A could prevent the disease. In 1922, McCollum tested modified cod liver oil in which the vitamin A had been destroyed. The modified oil cured the sick dogs, so McCollum concluded the factor in cod liver oil which cured rickets was distinct from vitamin A. He called it vitamin D because it was the fourth vitamin to be named.

In 1925, it was established that when 7-dehydrocholesterol is irradiated with light, a form of a fat-soluble substance is produced, now known as vitamin D_{3}. Adolf Windaus, at the University of Göttingen in Germany, received the Nobel Prize in Chemistry in 1928 "for the services rendered through his research into the constitution of the sterols and their connection with the vitamins". Alfred Fabian Hess, his research associate, stated: "Light equals vitamin D." In 1932, Otto Rosenheim and Harold King published a paper putting forward structures for sterols and bile acids, and soon thereafter collaborated with Kenneth Callow and others on the isolation and characterization of vitamin D. Windaus further clarified the chemical structure of vitamin D.

In 1969, a specific binding protein for vitamin D called the vitamin D receptor was identified. Shortly thereafter, the conversion of vitamin D to calcifediol and then to calcitriol, the biologically active form, was confirmed. The photosynthesis of vitamin D_{3} in skin via previtamin D_{3} and its subsequent metabolism was described in 1980.

The discovery of vitamin D helped to increase the viability and prevalence of intensive animal farming. Prior to its discovery, mortality rates were higher whenever farm animals were moved indoors during winter. Being able to place vitamin D in the feed removed that issue and enabled placing a high number of animals in year-round indoor farming.

== Types ==
Name	Chemical composition	Precursor	Structure
Vitamin D_{1}	1:1 mixture of ergocalciferol and lumisterol	ergosterol	
Vitamin D_{2}	ergocalciferol	ergosterol (fungi)	Note double bond at top center.
Vitamin D_{3}	cholecalciferol	7-dehydrocholesterol (animal skin, most eukaryotes)	
Vitamin D_{4}	22-dihydroergocalciferol	22,23-dihydroergosterol (mushrooms)	
Vitamin D_{5}	sitocalciferol	7-dehydrositosterol (plants)	
Vitamin D_{6}	stigmacalciferol	7-dehydrostigmasterol (plants)	
Vitamin D_{7}	campecalciferol	7-dehydrocampesterol (plants)	

Several forms (vitamers) of vitamin D exist, with the two major forms being vitamin D_{2} (ergocalciferol), and vitamin D_{3} (cholecalciferol). The common-use term "vitamin D" refers to both D_{2} and D_{3}, which were chemically characterized, respectively, in 1931 and 1935. Vitamin D_{3} was shown to result from the ultraviolet irradiation of 7-dehydrocholesterol. Although a chemical nomenclature for vitamin D forms was recommended in 1981, alternative names remain commonly used.

Chemically, the various forms of vitamin D are secosteroids, meaning that one of the bonds in the steroid rings is broken. The structural difference between vitamin D_{2} and vitamin D_{3} lies in the side chain: vitamin D_{2} has a double bond between carbons 22 and 23, and a methyl group on carbon 24. Vitamin D analogues have also been synthesized.

US dietary guides generally assume that all of a person's vitamin D is taken orally, given the potential for insufficient sunlight exposure due to urban living, cultural choices for the amount of clothing worn when outdoors, and use of sunscreen because of concerns about safe levels of sunlight exposure, including the risk of skin cancer.

== Biology ==
The active vitamin D metabolite, calcitriol, exerts its biological effects by binding to the vitamin D receptor (VDR), which is primarily located in the nuclei of target cells. When calcitriol binds to the VDR, it enables the receptor to act as a transcription factor, modulating the gene expression of transport proteins involved in calcium absorption in the intestine, such as TRPV6 and calbindin. The VDR is part of the nuclear receptor superfamily of steroid hormone receptors, which are hormone-dependent regulators of gene expression. These receptors are expressed in cells across most organs. VDR expression decreases as age increases.

Activation of VDR in the intestine, bone, kidney, and parathyroid gland cells is central to maintaining calcium and phosphorus levels in the blood, a process that is assisted by parathyroid hormone and calcitonin, thereby supporting bone health. VDR also regulates cell proliferation and differentiation. Additionally, vitamin D influences the immune system, with VDRs being expressed in several types of white blood cells, including monocytes and activated T and B cells.

== Deficiency ==
Worldwide, more than one billion people – infants, children, adults and elderly – can be considered vitamin D deficient, with reported percentages dependent on what measurement is used to define "deficient". A 2023 systematic review in The Lancet Regional Health estimated that ~15% of the global population is vitamin D deficient when defined as serum 25(OH)D <30 nmol/L, with higher prevalence in regions with limited sunlight exposure. Deficiency is common in the Middle-East, Asia, Africa and South America, but also exists in North America and Europe. Dark-skinned populations in North America, Europe and Australia have a higher percentage of deficiency compared to light-skinned populations that had their origins in Europe.

Serum 25(OH)D concentration is used as a biomarker for vitamin D deficiency. Units of measurement are either ng/mL or nmol/L, with one ng/mL equal to 2.5 nmol/L. There is no consensus on defining vitamin D deficiency, insufficiency, sufficiency, or optimal for all aspects of health. According to the US Institute of Medicine Dietary Reference Intake Committee, below 30 nmol/L significantly increases the risk of vitamin D deficiency caused rickets in infants and young children and reduces absorption of dietary calcium from the normal range of 60–80% to as low as 15%, whereas above 40 nmol/L is needed to prevent osteomalacia bone loss in the elderly, and above 50 nmol/L to be sufficient for all health needs. Other sources have defined deficiency as less than 25 nmol/L, insufficiency as 30–50 nmol/L and a level for "optimal" intake remains controversial and under research, as of 2026. Part of the controversy is because studies have reported differences in serum levels of 25(OH)D between ethnic groups, with studies pointing to genetic as well as environmental reasons behind these variations. African-American populations have lower serum 25(OH)D than their age-matched white population, but at all ages have superior calcium absorption efficiency, a higher bone mineral density, and as elderly, a lower risk of osteoporosis and fractures.

Using the 25(OH)D assay as a screening tool of the generally healthy population to identify and treat individuals is considered not as cost-effective as a government-mandated fortification program. Instead, there is a recommendation that testing should be limited to those showing symptoms of vitamin D deficiency or who have health conditions known to cause vitamin deficiency.

=== Causes ===
Causes of insufficient vitamin D synthesis in the skin include insufficient exposure to UVB light from sunlight due to living in high latitudes (farther distance from the equator with resultant shorter daylight hours in winter). Serum concentration by the end of winter can be lower by one-third to half that at the end of summer. The prevalence of vitamin D deficiency increases with age due to a decrease in 7-dehydrocholesterol synthesis in the skin and a decline in kidney capacity to convert calcidiol to calcitriol, the latter seen to a greater degree in people with chronic kidney disease. Despite these age effects, elderly people can still synthesize sufficient calcitriol if enough skin is exposed to UVB light. Absent that, a dietary supplement is recommended. Other causes of insufficient synthesis are sunlight being blocked by air pollution, urban/indoor living, long-term hospitalizations and stays in extended care facilities, cultural or religious lifestyle choices that favor sun-blocking clothing, recommendations to use sun-blocking clothing or sunscreen to reduce risk of skin cancer, and lastly, the UV-B blocking nature of dark skin.

Consumption of foods that naturally contain vitamin D is rarely sufficient to maintain a recommended serum concentration of 25(OH)D in the absence of the contribution of skin synthesis. Fractional contributions are roughly 20% diet and 80% sunlight. Vegans had a lower dietary intake of vitamin D and lower serum 25(OH)D when compared to omnivores, with lacto-ovo-vegetarians falling in between due to the vitamin content of egg yolks and fortified dairy products. Governments have mandated or voluntary food fortification programs to bridge the difference in, respectively, 15 and 10 countries. The US is one of the few mandated countries. The original fortification practices, circa the early 1930s, were limited to cow's milk, which had a large effect on reducing infant and child rickets. In July 2016 the US Food and Drug Administration approved the addition of vitamin D to plant milk beverages intended as milk alternatives, such as beverages made from soy, almond, coconut, and oats. At an individual level, people may choose to consume a multivitamin/mineral product or else a vitamin-D-only product.

There are many disease states, medical treatments, and medications that put people at risk for vitamin D deficiency. Chronic diseases that increase risk include kidney and liver failure, Crohn's disease, inflammatory bowel disease, and malabsorption syndromes such as cystic fibrosis, and hyper- or hypo-parathyroidism. Obesity sequesters vitamin D in fat tissues, thereby lowering serum levels, but bariatric surgery to treat obesity interferes with dietary vitamin D absorption, also causing deficiency. Medications interacting with vitamin D metabolism include antiretrovirals, anti-seizure drugs, glucocorticoids, systemic antifungals such as ketoconazole, cholestyramine, and rifampicin. Organ transplant recipients receive immunosuppressive therapy that is associated with an increased risk to develop skin cancer, so they are advised to avoid sunlight exposure, and to take a vitamin D supplement.

=== Treatment ===
Daily dose regimens are preferred to admission of large doses at weekly or monthly schedules, and D_{3} may be preferred over D_{2}, but there is a lack of consensus as to optimal type, dose, duration or what to measure to deem success. Daily regimens on the order of 4,000 IU/day (for other than infants) have a greater effect on 25(OH)D recovery from deficiency and a lower risk of side effects compared to weekly or monthly bolus doses, with the latter as high as 100,000 IU. The only advantage of bolus dosing could be better compliance, as bolus dosing is usually administered by a healthcare professional rather than self-administered. While some studies have found that vitamin D_{3} raises 25(OH)D blood levels faster and remains active in the body longer, others contend that vitamin D_{2} sources are equally bioavailable and effective for raising and sustaining 25(OH)D. If digestive disorders compromise absorption, then intramuscular injection of up to 100,000 IU of vitamin D_{3} is therapeutic.

=== Dark skin as deficiency risk ===
Melanin, specifically the sub-type eumelanin, is a biomolecule consisting of linked molecules of oxidized amino acid tyrosine. It is produced by cells called melanocytes in a process called melanogenesis. In the skin, melanin is located in the bottom layer (the stratum basale) of the skin's epidermis. Melanin can be permanently incorporated into the skin, resulting in dark skin, or else have its synthesis initiated by exposure to UV radiation, causing the skin to darken as a temporary sun tan. Eumelanin is an effective absorbent of light; the pigment can dissipate over 99.9% of absorbed UV radiation. Because of this property, eumelanin is thought to protect skin cells from sunlight's ultraviolet A (UVA) and ultraviolet B (UVB) radiation damage, reducing the risk of skin tissue folate depletion, preventing premature skin aging and reducing the risks of sunburn and skin cancer. Melanin inhibits UVB-powered vitamin D synthesis in the skin. In areas of the world not distant from the equator, abundant, year-round exposure to sunlight means that even dark-skinned populations have adequate skin synthesis. However, when dark-skinned people cover much of their bodies with clothing for cultural or climate reasons, or are living a primarily indoor life in urban conditions, or live at higher latitudes which provide less sunlight in winter, they are at risk for vitamin D deficiency.

Vitamin D deficiency is particularly common among people with a dark complexion. However, despite having on-average 25(OH)D serum concentrations below the 50 nmol/L amount considered sufficient, African Americans have higher bone mineral density and lower fracture risk when compared to European-origin people. Possible mechanisms may include higher calcium retention, lower calcium excretion, and greater bone resistance to parathyroid hormone, also genetically lower serum vitamin D-binding protein which would result in adequate bioavailable 25(OH)D despite total serum 25(OH)D being lower. The bone density and fracture risk paradox does not necessarily carry over to non-skeletal health conditions, such as arterial calcification, cancer, diabetes or all-cause mortality. People with dark complexions may need different definitions for vitamin D deficiency, insufficiency, and adequate.

=== Infant deficiency ===
Comparative studies carried out in lactating mothers indicate a mean value of vitamin D content in the breast milk of 45 IU/liter. This vitamin D content is too low to meet the vitamin D requirement of 400 IU/day recommended by several government organizations ("...as breast milk is not a meaningful source of vitamin D."). The same government organizations recommend that lactating women consume 600 IU/day, but this is insufficient to raise breast milk content to deliver recommended intake. There is evidence that breast milk content can be increased, but because the transfer of the vitamin from the lactating mother's serum to milk is inefficient, this requires that she consume a dietary supplement above the government-set safe upper limit of 4,000 IU/day. Given the shortfall, there are recommendations that breast-fed infants be fed a vitamin D dietary supplement of 400 IU/day during the first year of life. If not breastfeeding, infant formulas are designed to deliver 400 IU/day for an infant consuming a liter of formula per day – a normal volume for a full-term infant after the first month.

== Excess ==
Vitamin D toxicity, or hypervitaminosis D, is the toxic state of an excess of vitamin D. It is rare, having occurred historically during a time of unregulated fortification of foods, especially those provided to infants, or more recently, with consumption of high-dose vitamin D dietary supplements following inappropriate prescribing, non-prescribed consumption of high-dose, over-the-counter preparations, or manufacturing errors resulting in content far in excess of what is on the label. Ultraviolet light alone – sunlight or tanning beds – can raise serum 25(OH)D concentration to a bit higher than 100 nmol/L, but not to a level that causes hypervitaminosis D, the reasons being that there is a limiting amount of the precursor 7-dehydrocholesterol synthesized in the skin and a negative feedback in the kidney wherein the presence of calcitriol induces diversion to metabolically inactive 24,25-hydroxyvitamin D rather than metabolically active calcitriol (1,25-hydroxyvitamin D). Further metabolism yields calcitroic acid, an inactive water-soluble compound that is excreted in bile.

There is no general agreement about the intake levels at which vitamin D may cause harm. According to the IOM review, "Doses below 10,000 IU/day are not usually associated with toxicity, whereas doses equal to or above 50,000 IU/day for several weeks or months are frequently associated with toxic side effects including documented hypercalcemia." The normal range for blood concentration of 25-hydroxyvitamin D in adults is 20 to 50 nanograms per milliliter (ng/mL; equivalent to 50 to 125 nmol/L). Blood levels necessary to cause adverse effects in adults are thought to be greater than about 150 ng/mL.

An excess of vitamin D causes hypercalcaemia (high blood concentrations of calcium), which can cause overcalcification of the bones and soft tissues including arteries, heart, and kidneys. Untreated, this can lead to irreversible kidney failure. Symptoms of vitamin D toxicity may include the following: increased thirst, increased urination, nausea, vomiting, diarrhea, decreased appetite, irritability, constipation, fatigue, muscle weakness, and insomnia.

In 2011, the US National Academy of Medicine revised tolerable upper intake levels (UL) to protect against vitamin D toxicity. Before the revision the UL for ages 9+ years was 50 μg/d (2000 IU/d). Per the revision: "UL is defined as "the highest average daily intake of a nutrient that is likely to pose no risk of adverse health effects for nearly all persons in the general population". The US ULs in micrograms (mcg or μg) and international units (IU) for both males and females, by age, are:

- 0–6 months: 25 μg/d (1000 IU/d)
- 7–12 months: 38 μg/d (1500 IU/d)
- 1–3 years: 63 μg/d (2500 IU/d)
- 4–8 years: 75 μg/d (3000 IU/d)
- 9+ years: 100 μg/d (4000 IU/d)
- Pregnant and lactating: 100 μg/d (4000 IU/d)

Although in the US the adult UL is set at 4,000 IU/day, over-the-counter products are available at 5,000, 10,000 and even 50,000 IU (the last with directions to take once a week). The percentage of the US population taking over 4,000 IU/day has increased since 1999.

=== Treatment ===
In almost every case, stopping the vitamin D supplementation combined with a low-calcium diet and corticosteroid drugs will allow for a full recovery within a month.

=== Special cases ===
Idiopathic infantile hypercalcemia is caused by a mutation of the CYP24A1 gene, leading to a reduction in the degradation of vitamin D. Infants who have such a mutation have an increased sensitivity to vitamin D and in case of additional intake a risk of hypercalcaemia. The disorder can continue into adulthood.

== Health effects ==
Supplementation with vitamin D is a reliable method for preventing or treating rickets. On the other hand, the effects of vitamin D supplementation on non-skeletal health are uncertain. A review did not find any effect from supplementation on the rates of non-skeletal disease, other than a tentative decrease in mortality in the elderly. Vitamin D supplements do not alter the outcomes for myocardial infarction, stroke or cerebrovascular disease, cancer, bone fractures or knee osteoarthritis.

A US Institute of Medicine (IOM) report states: "Outcomes related to cancer, cardiovascular disease and hypertension, and diabetes and metabolic syndrome, falls and physical performance, immune functioning and autoimmune disorders, infections, neuropsychological functioning, and preeclampsia could not be linked reliably with intake of either calcium or vitamin D, and were often conflicting." Evidence for and against each disease state is provided in detail. Some researchers claim the IOM was too definitive in its recommendations and made a mathematical mistake when calculating the blood level of vitamin D associated with bone health. Members of the IOM panel maintain that they used a "standard procedure for dietary recommendations" and that the report is solidly based on the data.

=== Mortality, all-causes ===
Vitamin D_{3} supplementation has been tentatively found to lead to a reduced risk of death in the elderly, but the effect has not been deemed pronounced, or certain enough, to make taking supplements recommendable. Other forms (vitamin D_{2}, alfacalcidol, and calcitriol) do not appear to have any beneficial effects concerning the risk of death. High blood levels appear to be associated with a lower risk of death, but it is unclear if supplementation can result in this benefit. Both an excess and a deficiency in vitamin D appear to cause abnormal functioning and premature aging. The relationship between serum calcifediol concentrations and all-cause mortality is "U-shaped": mortality is elevated at high and low calcifediol levels, relative to moderate levels. Harm from elevated calcifediol appears to occur at a lower level in dark-skinned Canadian and American populations than in light-skinned populations.

=== Bone health ===
==== Rickets ====
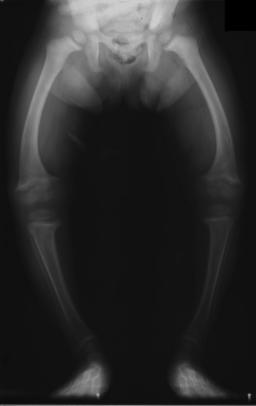
X-ray of the legs of a two-year-old child with rickets showing bowing of the femur and low bone density

Rickets, a childhood disease, is characterized by impeded growth and soft, weak, deformed long bones that bend and bow under their weight as children start to walk. Maternal vitamin D deficiency can cause fetal bone defects from before birth and impairment of bone quality after birth. Rickets typically presents between 3 and 18 months of age. This condition can be caused by vitamin D, calcium or phosphorus deficiency. Vitamin D deficiency remains the main cause of rickets among young infants in most countries because breast milk is low in vitamin D, and darker skin, social customs, and climatic conditions can contribute to inadequate sun exposure. A post-weaning Western omnivore diet characterized by high intakes of meat, fish, eggs and vitamin-D–fortified milk is protective, whereas low intakes of those foods and high (unfortified) cereal/grain intake contribute to risk. For young children with rickets, supplementation with vitamin D plus calcium was superior to the vitamin alone for bone healing.

==== Osteomalacia and osteoporosis ====
Characteristics of osteomalacia are softening of the bones, leading to bending of the spine, bone fragility, and increased risk for fractures. Osteomalacia is usually present when 25-hydroxyvitamin D levels are less than about 10 ng/mL. Osteomalacia can progress to osteoporosis, a condition of reduced bone mineral density with increased bone fragility and risk of bone fractures. Osteoporosis can be a long-term effect of calcium and/or vitamin D insufficiency, the latter contributing by reducing calcium absorption. In the absence of confirmed vitamin D deficiency there is no evidence that vitamin D supplementation without concomitant calcium slows or stops the progression of osteomalacia to osteoporosis. For older people with osteoporosis, taking vitamin D with calcium may help prevent hip fractures, but it also slightly increases the risk of stomach and kidney problems. The reduced risk for fractures is not seen in healthier, community-dwelling elderly. Low serum vitamin D levels have been associated with falls, but taking extra vitamin D does not appear to reduce that risk.

Athletes who are vitamin D deficient are at an increased risk of stress fractures and/or major breaks, particularly those engaging in contact sports. Incremental decreases in risk are observed with rising serum 25(OH)D concentrations plateauing at 50 ng/mL with no additional benefits seen in levels beyond this point.

=== Cancer ===
While serum low 25-hydroxyvitamin D status has been associated with a higher risk of cancer in observational studies, the general conclusion is that there is insufficient evidence for an effect of vitamin D supplementation on the risk of cancer, although there is some evidence for reduction in cancer mortality.

=== Cardiovascular disease ===
Vitamin D supplementation is not associated with a reduced risk of stroke, cerebrovascular disease, myocardial infarction, or ischemic heart disease. Supplementation does not lower blood pressure in the general population. One meta-analysis found a small increase in risk of stroke when calcium and vitamin D supplements were taken together.

=== Immune system ===
Vitamin D receptors are found in cell types involved in immunity. Functions are not understood. Some autoimmune and infectious diseases are associated with vitamin D deficiency, but either there is no evidence that supplementation has a benefit or not, or for some, evidence indicating there are no benefits.

==== Autoimmune diseases ====
Low plasma vitamin D concentrations have been reported for autoimmune thyroid diseases, lupus, myasthenia gravis, rheumatoid arthritis, and multiple sclerosis. For multiple sclerosis and rheumatoid arthritis, intervention trials using vitamin D supplementation did not demonstrate therapeutic effects.

==== Infectious diseases ====
A 2021 meta-analysis found that "vitamin D supplementation was safe and overall reduced the risk of ARI […] although the risk reduction was small". In general, vitamin D functions to activate the innate and dampen the adaptive immune systems with antibacterial, antiviral and anti-inflammatory effects. Low serum levels of vitamin D appear to be a risk factor for tuberculosis. However, supplementation trials showed no benefit.

==== Inflammatory bowel disease ====
Vitamin D deficiency has been linked to the severity of inflammatory bowel disease (IBD). However, whether vitamin D deficiency causes IBD or is a consequence of the disease is not clear. Supplementation leads to improvements in scores for clinical inflammatory bowel disease activity and biochemical markers, and less frequent relapse of symptoms in IBD.

==== Asthma ====
Vitamin D supplementation does not help prevent asthma attacks or alleviate symptoms.

=== COVID-19 ===
In July 2020, the US National Institutes of Health stated "There is insufficient evidence to recommend for or against using vitamin D supplementation for the prevention or treatment of COVID-19." In that same year, the UK National Institute for Health and Care Excellence (NICE) position was to not recommend to offer a vitamin D supplement to people solely to prevent or treat COVID-19. NICE updated its position in 2022 to "Do not use vitamin D to treat COVID-19 except as part of a clinical trial." Both organizations included recommendations to continue the previously established recommendations on vitamin D supplementation for other reasons, such as bone and muscle health, as applicable. Both organizations noted that more people may require supplementation due to lower amounts of sun exposure during the pandemic.

Vitamin D deficiency and insufficiency have been associated with adverse outcomes in COVID-19. Supplementation trials, mostly large, single, oral dose upon hospital admission, reported lower subsequent transfers to intensive care and to all-cause mortality.

=== Other diseases and conditions ===
==== Chronic obstructive pulmonary disease ====
Meta analysis has shown vitamin D supplementation did not influence the overall number of moderate or severe exacerbations of chronic obstructive pulmonary disease (COPD), but did reveal a protective effect in a subgroup with low vitamin D (baseline 25-hydroxyvitamin D levels <25 nmol/L).

==== Diabetes ====
A meta-analysis reported that vitamin D supplementation significantly reduced the risk of type 2 diabetes for non-obese people with prediabetes. Another meta-analysis reported that vitamin D supplementation significantly improved glycemic control [homeostatic model assessment-insulin resistance (HOMA-IR)], hemoglobin A1C (HbA1C), and fasting blood glucose (FBG) in individuals with type 2 diabetes. In prospective studies, high versus low levels of vitamin D were respectively associated with a significant decrease in risk of type 2 diabetes, combined type 2 diabetes and prediabetes, and prediabetes. A systematic review included one clinical trial that showed vitamin D supplementation together with insulin maintained levels of fasting C-peptide after 12 months better than insulin alone.

==== Attention deficit hyperactivity disorder (ADHD) ====
A meta-analysis of observational studies showed that children with ADHD have lower vitamin D levels and that there was a small association between low vitamin D levels at the time of birth and later development of ADHD. Several small, randomized controlled trials of vitamin D supplementation indicated improved ADHD symptoms such as impulsivity and hyperactivity.

==== Depression ====
A 2014 systematic review concluded that vitamin D supplementation does not reduce depressive symptoms overall but may have a moderate benefit for patients with clinically significant depression, though more high-quality studies were determined to be needed.

==== Cognition and dementia ====
A systematic review of clinical studies found an association between low vitamin D levels with cognitive impairment and a higher risk of developing Alzheimer's disease. However, lower vitamin D concentrations are also associated with poor nutrition and spending less time outdoors. Therefore, alternative explanations for the increase in cognitive impairment exist and hence a direct causal relationship between vitamin D levels and cognition could not be established.

==== Schizophrenia ====
People diagnosed with schizophrenia tend to have lower serum vitamin D concentrations compared to those without the condition. This may be a consequence of the disease rather than a cause, due, for example, to low dietary vitamin D and less time spent exposed to sunlight. Results from supplementation trials have been inconclusive.

==== Sexual dysfunction ====
Erectile dysfunction can be a consequence of vitamin D deficiency. Mechanisms may include the regulation of vascular stiffness, the production of vasodilating nitric oxide, and the regulation of vessel permeability. However, the clinical trial literature does not yet contain sufficient evidence that supplementation treats the problem. Part of the complexity is that vitamin D deficiency is also linked to morbidities that are associated with erectile dysfunction, such as obesity, hypertension, diabetes mellitus, hypercholesterolemia, chronic kidney disease and hypogonadism.

In women, vitamin D receptors are expressed in the superficial layers of the urogenital organs. There is an association between vitamin D deficiency and a decline in sexual functions, including sexual desire, orgasm, and satisfaction in women, with symptom severity correlated with vitamin D serum concentration. The clinical trial literature does not yet contain sufficient evidence that supplementation reverses these dysfunctions or improves other aspects of vaginal or urogenital health.

==== Pregnancy ====
Pregnant women often do not take the recommended amount of vitamin D. Low levels of vitamin D in pregnancy are associated with gestational diabetes, pre-eclampsia, and small for gestational age infants. Although taking vitamin D supplements during pregnancy raises blood levels of vitamin D in the mother at term, the full extent of benefits for the mother or baby is unclear.

==== Obesity ====
Obesity increases the risk of having low serum vitamin D. Supplementation does not lead to weight loss, but weight loss increases serum vitamin D. The theory is that fatty tissue sequesters vitamin D. Bariatric surgery as a treatment for obesity can lead to vitamin deficiencies. Long-term follow-up reported deficiencies for vitamins D, E, A, K and B12, with D the most common at 36%.

==== Uterine fibroids ====
There is evidence that the pathogenesis of uterine fibroids is associated with low serum vitamin D and that supplementation reduces the size of fibroids.

==== Tooth decay ====
In one review, deficiency of vitamin D in children increased the risk of tooth decay by about 22%.

== Allowed health claims ==
Governmental regulatory agencies stipulate for the food and dietary supplement industries certain health claims as allowable as statements on packaging.

Europe: European Food Safety Authority (EFSA)

- normal function of the immune system
- normal inflammatory response
- normal muscle function
- reduced risk of falling in people over age 60

US: Food and Drug Administration (FDA)

- "Adequate calcium and vitamin D, as part of a well-balanced diet, along with physical activity, may reduce the risk of osteoporosis."

Canada: Health Canada

- "Adequate calcium and regular exercise may help achieve strong bones in children and adolescents and reduce the risk of osteoporosis in older adults. An adequate intake of vitamin D is also necessary."

Japan: Foods with Nutrient Function Claims (FNFC)

- "Vitamin D is a nutrient which promotes the absorption of calcium in the gut intestine and aids in the development of bone."

== Dietary intake ==
United Kingdom
Age group	Intake (μg/day)	Maximum intake (μg/day)
Breast-fed infants 0–12 months	8.5–10	25
Formula-fed infants (<500 mL/d)	10	25
Children 1 – 10 years	10	50
Children >10 and adults	10	100
United States
Age group	RDA (IU/day)	(μg/day)
Infants 0–6 months	400*	10
Infants 6–12 months	400*	10
1–70 years	600	15
Adults > 70 years	800	20
Pregnant/Lactating	600	15
Age group	Tolerable upper intake level (IU/day)	(μg/day)
Infants 0–6 months	1,000	25
Infants 6–12 months	1,500	37.5
1–3 years	2,500	62.5
4–8 years	3,000	75
9+ years	4,000	100
Pregnant/lactating	4,000	100
Canada
Age group	RDA (IU)	Tolerable upper intake (IU)
Infants 0–6 months	400*	1,000
Infants 7–12 months	400*	1,500
Children 1–3 years	600	2,500
Children 4–8 years	600	3,000
Children and adults 9–70 years	600	4,000
Adults > 70 years	800	4,000
Pregnancy & lactation	600	4,000
Australia and New Zealand
Age group	Adequate Intake (μg)	Upper Level of Intake (μg)
Infants 0–12 months	5*	25
Children 1–18 years	5*	80
Adults 19–50 years	5*	80
Adults 51–70 years	10*	80
Adults > 70 years	15*	80
European Food Safety Authority
Age group	Adequate Intake (μg)	Tolerable upper limit (μg)
Infants 0–12 months	10	25
Children 1–10 years	15	50
Children 11–17 years	15	100
Adults	15	100
Pregnancy & Lactation	15	100
* Adequate intake, no RDA/RDI yet established

=== Recommended levels ===
Various government institutions have proposed different recommendations for the amount of daily intake of vitamin D. These vary according to age, pregnancy, or lactation, and the extent assumptions are made regarding skin synthesis. Older recommendations were lower. For example, the US Adequate Intake recommendations from 1997 were 200 IU/day for infants, children, adults to age 50, and women during pregnancy or lactation, 400 IU/day for ages 51–70, and 600 IU/day for 71 and older.

Conversion: 1 μg (microgram) = 40 IU (international unit). For dietary recommendation and food labeling purposes government agencies consider vitamin D_{3} and D_{2} bioequivalent.

==== United Kingdom ====
The UK National Health Service (NHS) recommends that people at risk of vitamin D deficiency, breast-fed babies, formula-fed babies taking no more than 500 ml of infant formula a day, and children aged 6 months to 4 years, should take daily vitamin D supplements throughout the year to ensure sufficient intake. This includes people with limited skin synthesis of vitamin D, who are not often outdoors, are frail, housebound, living in a care home, or usually wearing clothes that cover up most of the skin, or with dark skin, such as having an African, African-Caribbean or south Asian background. Other people may be able to make adequate vitamin D from sunlight exposure from April to September. The NHS and Public Health England recommend that everyone, including those who are pregnant and breastfeeding, consider taking a daily supplement containing 10 μg (400 IU) of vitamin D during autumn and winter because of inadequate sunlight for vitamin D synthesis.

==== United States ====
The dietary reference intake for vitamin D issued in 2011 by the Institute of Medicine (IoM) (renamed National Academy of Medicine in 2015), superseded previous recommendations which were expressed in terms of adequate intake. The recommendations were formed assuming the individual has no skin synthesis of vitamin D because of inadequate sun exposure. The reference intake for vitamin D refers to total intake from food, beverages, and supplements, and assumes that calcium requirements are being met. The tolerable upper intake level (UL) is defined as "the highest average daily intake of a nutrient that is likely to pose no risk of adverse health effects for nearly all persons in the general population". Although ULs are believed to be safe, information on the long-term effects is incomplete and these levels of intake are not recommended for long-term consumption.

For US food and dietary supplement labeling purposes, the amount in a serving is expressed as a percent of Daily Value (%DV). For vitamin D labeling purposes, 100% of the daily value was 400 IU (10 μg), but in May 2016, it was revised to 800 IU (20 μg) to bring it into agreement with the recommended dietary allowance (RDA). A table of the old and new adult daily values is provided at Reference Daily Intake. In 2024, the Endocrine Society advised healthy adult under age 75 not to take vitamin D above the recommended daily amount unless there is a specific reason. It also advised against routine vitamin D blood testing for healthy adults.

==== Canada ====
Health Canada published recommended dietary intakes (DRIs) and tolerable upper intake levels (ULs) for vitamin D.

==== Australia and New Zealand ====
Australia and New Zealand published nutrient reference values including guidelines for dietary vitamin D intake in 2006. About a third of Australians have vitamin D deficiency.

==== European Union ====
The European Food Safety Authority (EFSA) in 2016 reviewed the current evidence, finding the relationship between serum 25(OH)D concentration and musculoskeletal health outcomes is widely variable. They considered that average requirements and population reference intake values for vitamin D cannot be derived and that a serum 25(OH)D concentration of 50 nmol/L was a suitable target value. For all people over the age of 1, including women who are pregnant or lactating, they set an adequate intake of 15 μg/day (600 IU).

On the other hand, the EU Commission defined nutrition labelling for foodstuffs as regards recommended daily allowances (RDA) for vitamin D to 5 μg/day (200 IU) as 100%.

The EFSA reviewed safe levels of intake in 2012, setting the tolerable upper limit for adults at 100 μg/day (4000 IU), a similar conclusion as the IOM.

The Swedish National Food Agency recommends a daily intake of 10 μg (400 IU) of vitamin D_{3} for children and adults up to 75 years, and 20 μg (800 IU) for adults 75 and older.

Non-government organisations in Europe have made their own recommendations. The German Society for Nutrition recommends 20 μg. The European Menopause and Andropause Society recommends postmenopausal women consume 15 μg (600 IU) until age 70, and 20 μg (800 IU) from age 71. This dose should be increased to 100 μg (4,000 IU) in some patients with very low vitamin D status or in case of co-morbid conditions.

=== Food sources ===
Few foods naturally contain vitamin D. Cod liver oil as a dietary supplement contains 450 IU/teaspoon. Fatty fish (but not lean fish such as tuna) are the best natural food sources of vitamin D_{3}. Beef liver, eggs, and cheese have modest amounts. Mushrooms provide variable amounts of vitamin D_{2}, as mushrooms can be treated with UV light to greatly increase their content. In certain countries, breakfast cereals, dairy milk and plant milk products are fortified. Infant formulas are fortified with 400 to 1000 IU per liter, a normal volume for a full-term infant after the first month. Cooking only minimally decreases vitamin content.

Food source	Amount (IU / serving)
Trout (rainbow), farmed, cooked, 3 ounces	645
Salmon (sockeye), cooked, 3 ounces	570
Mushrooms, exposed to UV light, 1/2 cup (120 mL)	366
Mushrooms, not exposed to UV light, 1/2 cup (120 mL)	7
Milk, 2% milkfat, fortified, 1 cup	120
Plant milks, fortified, 1 cup	100–144
Ready-to-eat cereal, fortified, 1 serving	80
Egg, 1 large, scrambled	44
Liver, beef, cooked, 3 ounces	42
Cheese, cheddar, 1.5 ounce	17

=== Fortification ===
In the early 1930s, the United States and countries in northern Europe began to fortify milk with vitamin D in an effort to eradicate rickets. This, plus medical advice to expose infants to sunlight, effectively ended the high prevalence of rickets. The proven health benefit of vitamin D led to fortification to many foods, even foods such as hot dogs and beer. In the 1950s, due to some highly publicized cases of hypercalcemia and birth defects, vitamin D fortification became regulated, and even discontinued in some countries. As of 2024, governments have established mandated or voluntary food fortification programs to combat deficiency in, respectively, 15 and 10 countries. Depending on the country, manufactured foods fortified with either D_{2} or D_{3} may include dairy milk and other dairy foods, fruit juices and fruit juice drinks, meal replacement food bars, soy-protein–based beverages, wheat flour or corn meal products, infant formulas, breakfast cereals and 'plant milks',.

== Biosynthesis and evolution ==
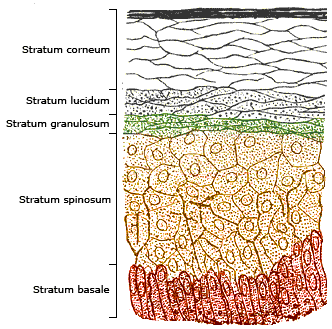
In the epidermal strata of the skin, vitamin D production is greatest in the stratum basale (colored red in the illustration) and stratum spinosum (colored light brown).

Vitamin D biosynthesis in animal and fungi

Synthesis of vitamin D in nature is dependent on the presence of UV radiation and subsequent activation in the liver and the kidneys. Many animals synthesize vitamin D_{3} from 7-dehydrocholesterol, and many fungi synthesize vitamin D_{2} from ergosterol.

Vitamin D_{3} is produced photochemically from 7-dehydrocholesterol in the skin of most vertebrate animals, including humans. The skin consists of two primary layers: the inner layer called the dermis, and the outer, thinner epidermis. Vitamin D is produced in the keratinocytes of the two innermost strata of the epidermis, the stratum basale and stratum spinosum, which also can produce calcitriol and express the vitamin D receptor. The 7-dehydrocholesterol reacts with UVB light at wavelengths of 290–315 nm. These wavelengths are present in sunlight, as well as in the light emitted by the UV lamps in tanning beds (which produce ultraviolet primarily in the UVA spectrum, but typically produce 4% to 10% of the total UV emissions as UVB). Exposure to light through windows is insufficient because glass almost completely blocks UVB light. In skin, either permanently in dark skin or temporarily due to tanning, melanin is located in the stratum basale, where it blocks UVB light and thus inhibits vitamin D synthesis.

The transformation in the skin that converts 7-dehydrocholesterol to vitamin D_{3} occurs in two steps. First, 7-dehydrocholesterol is photolyzed by ultraviolet light in a 6-electron conrotatory ring-opening electrocyclic reaction; the product is previtamin D_{3}. Second, previtamin D_{3} spontaneously isomerizes to vitamin D_{3} (cholecalciferol) via a [1,7]-sigmatropic hydrogen shift. In fungi, the conversion from ergosterol to vitamin D_{2} follows a similar procedure, forming previtamin D_{2} by UVB photolysis, which isomerizes to vitamin D_{2} (ergocalciferol). Side reactions lead to corresponding lumisterols and tachysterols.

=== Interactive pathway ===
Click on View at the bottom to open.

Click on genes, proteins and metabolites below to link to respective articles. (Note: The interactive pathway map can be edited at WikiPathways: "VitaminDSynthesis_WP1531".)

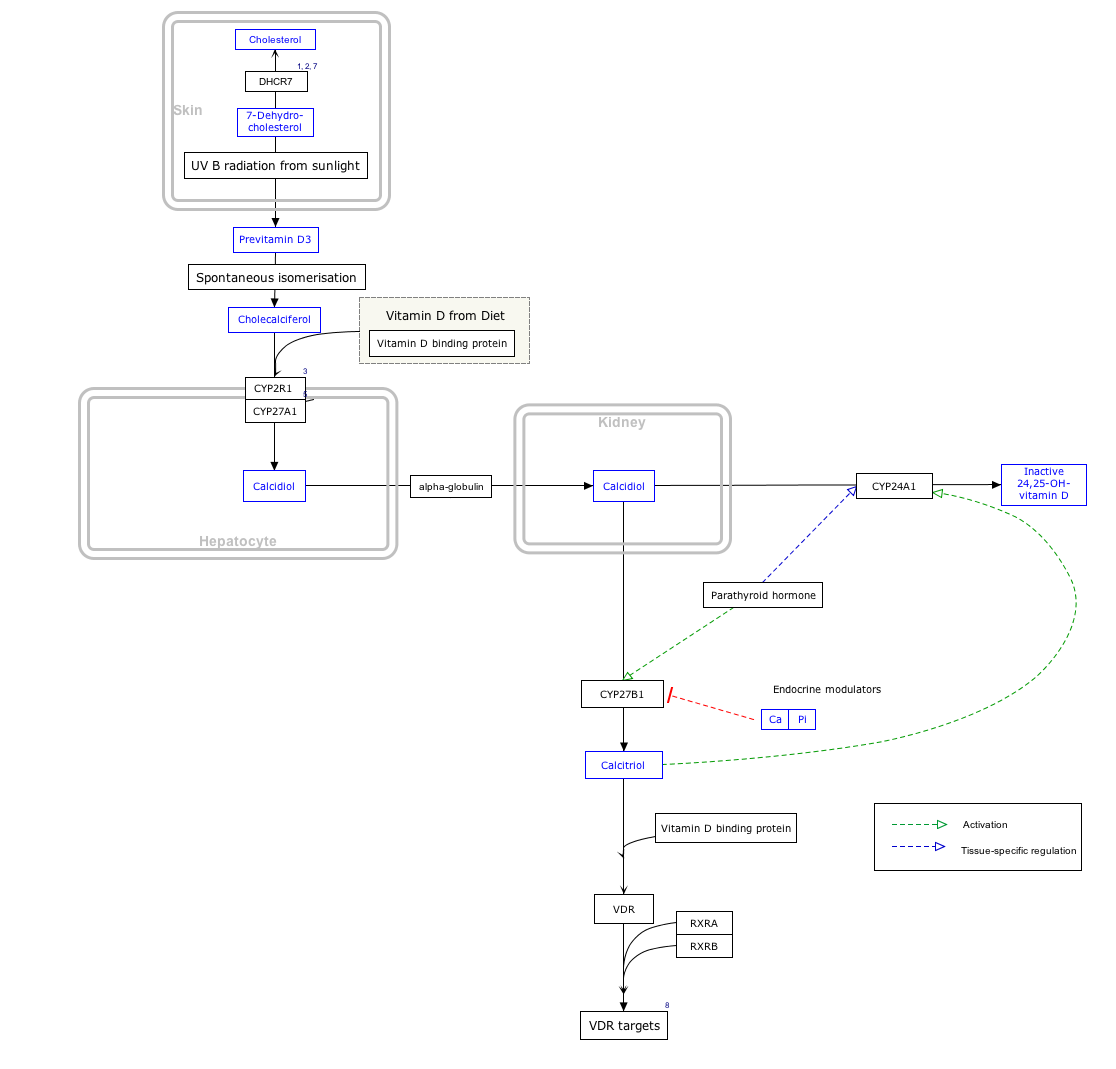

Vitamin D Synthesis Pathway (view / edit)

=== Evolution ===
For at least 1.2 billion years, eukaryotes—a classification of life forms that includes single-cell species, fungi, plants, and animals, but not bacteria, characterized by cells with a membrane-bound nucleus—have been able to synthesize 7-dehydrocholesterol. When this molecule is exposed to UVB light from the sun it absorbs the energy in the process of being converted to vitamin D. The function was to prevent DNA damage, the converted molecule being an end product without vitamin function. Present day, phytoplankton in the ocean photosynthesize vitamin D without any calcium management function, as do some species of algae, lichen, fungi, and plants. Only circa 500 million years ago, when animals began to leave the oceans for land, did the UV-converted molecule take on a hormone function as a promoter of calcium regulation. This function required the development of a nuclear vitamin D receptor (VDR) that binds the biologically active vitamin D metabolite 1α,25-dihydroxyvitamin (D_{3}), plasma transport proteins, and vitamin D metabolizing CYP450 enzymes regulated by calciotropic hormones. The triumvirate of receptor protein, transport and metabolizing enzymes are found only in vertebrates.

The initial vitamin function evolved for control of metabolic genes supporting innate and adaptive immunity. Only later did the VDR system start to act as an important regulator of calcium supply for a calcified skeleton in land-based vertebrates. From amphibians onward, bone management is biodynamic, with bone functioning as internal calcium reservoir under the control of osteoclasts via the combined action of parathyroid hormone and 1α,25-dihydroxyvitamin D_{3}.

==== Animal biosynthesis and food sources ====
Most land-based vertebrates – mammals, reptiles, birds, and amphibians – produce vitamin D in response to ultraviolet light. Carnivores and omnivores also get the vitamins from their diets, and herbivores can get some vitamins from fungi that are consumed along with plant foods. In the wild, reptiles require either exposure to sunlight or consumption of prey, or both. In captivity, artificial lighting that provides UVB light is preferred to fortified food. The same holds true for birds and amphibians. There are some exceptions. Feline species and dogs are practically incapable of vitamin D synthesis due to the high activity of 7-dehydrocholesterol reductase, which converts any 7-dehydrocholesterol in the skin to cholesterol before it can be UVB light-modified, but instead get vitamin D from diet.

Fish do not synthesize vitamin D from exposure to ultraviolet light. Wild-caught fish obtain vitamin D via a diet of phytoplankton, zooplankton, and the aquatic food chain. Commercially raised fish are fed D_{3} fortified diets. As with land-based vertebrates, the vitamin is transported by vitamin D binding protein to target cells. Aquaculture research shows that the vitamin is needed for bone health, optimizing growth, reducing fatty liver problems and supporting immune health. Unlike land-based vertebrates, large amounts of vitamin D_{3} are stored in the liver and fatty tissues, making fish a good dietary source for human consumption.

==== Human evolution ====
During the long period between one and three million years ago, the Australopithecine (ancestors of modern humans) underwent several evolutionary changes. A long-term climate shift toward drier conditions promoted life changes from sedentary forest-dwelling with a primarily plant-based diet toward upright walking/running on open terrain and more meat consumption. One consequence of the shift to a culture that included more physically active hunting was a need for evaporative cooling from sweat, which to be functional, meant an evolutionary shift toward less body hair, as evaporation from sweat-wet hair would have cooled the hair but not the skin underneath. A second consequence was darker skin. The early humans who evolved in the regions of the globe near the equator had permanent large quantities of melanin in their skin, resulting in brown/black skin tones. For people with light skin tone, exposure to UV radiation induces the synthesis of melanin causing the skin to darken, i.e., sun tanning. Either way, the pigment can protect skin by dissipating up to 99.9% of absorbed UV radiation. In this way, melanin protects skin cells from UVA and UVB radiation damage that causes photoaging and the risk of melanoma, a cancer of melanin cells. Melanin also protects against photodegradation of the vitamin folate in skin tissue and, in the eyes, preserves eye health.

The dark-skinned humans who had evolved in Africa populated the rest of the world through migration some 50,000 to 80,000 years ago. Following settlement in northward regions of Asia and Europe which seasonally get less sunlight, the selective pressure for radiation-protective skin tone decreased while a need for efficient vitamin D synthesis in skin increased, resulting in low-melanin, lighter skin tones in the rest of the prehistoric world. For people with low skin melanin, moderate sun exposure to the face, arms and lower legs several times a week is sufficient. However, for recent cultural changes such as indoor living and working, UV-blocking skin products to reduce the risk of sunburn and emigration of dark-skinned people to countries far from the equator have all contributed to an increased incidence of vitamin D insufficiency and deficiency that need to be addressed by food fortification and vitamin D dietary supplements.

=== Industrial synthesis ===
Vitamin D_{3} (cholecalciferol) is produced industrially by exposing 7-dehydrocholesterol to UVB and UVC light, followed by purification. The 7-dehydrocholesterol is sourced as an extraction from lanolin, a waxy skin secretion in sheep's wool. Vitamin D_{3} is also extracted from lichen and marketed as a vegan alternative. Vitamin D_{2} (ergocalciferol) is produced in a similar way using ergosterol from yeast as a starting material.

== Metabolism ==
=== Activation ===
Liver hydroxylation of cholecalciferol to calcifediol

Kidney hydroxylation of calcifediol to calcitriol

Whether synthesized in the skin or ingested, vitamin D is hydroxylated in the liver at position 25 (upper right of the molecule) to form the prohormone calcifediol, also referred to as 25(OH)D). This reaction is catalyzed by the microsomal enzyme vitamin D 25-hydroxylase, the product of the CYP2R1 human gene. Once made, the product is released into the blood where it is bound to vitamin D-binding protein.

Calcifediol is transported to the proximal tubules of the kidneys, where it is hydroxylated at the 1-α position (lower right of the molecule) to form calcitriol (1,25-dihydroxycalciferol, also referred to as 1,25(OH)_{2}D). The conversion of calcifediol to calcitriol is catalyzed by the enzyme 25-hydroxyvitamin D 1-alpha-hydroxylase, which is the product of the CYP27B1 human gene. The activity of CYP27B1 is increased by parathyroid hormone and also by low plasma calcium or phosphate. Following the final metabolic step in the kidney, calcitriol is released into circulation. By binding to vitamin D-binding protein, calcitriol is transported throughout the body. In addition to the kidneys, calcitriol is also synthesized by certain other cells, including monocyte-macrophages in the immune system. When synthesized by monocyte-macrophages, calcitriol acts locally as a cytokine, modulating body defenses against microbial invaders by stimulating the innate immune system.

=== Deactivation ===
The bioactivity of calcitriol is terminated by hydroxylation at position 24 by vitamin D3 24-hydroxylase, coded for by gene CYP24A1, forming calcitetrol. Further metabolism yields calcitroic acid, an inactive water-soluble compound that is excreted in bile.

Vitamin D_{2} (ergocalciferol) and vitamin D_{3} (cholecalciferol) share a similar but not identical mechanism of action. Metabolites produced by vitamin D_{2} are named with an er- or ergo- prefix to differentiate them from the D_{3}-based counterparts (sometimes with a chole- prefix).

- Metabolites produced from vitamin D_{2} tend to bind less well to the vitamin D-binding protein.
- Vitamin D_{3} can alternatively be hydroxylated to calcifediol by sterol 27-hydroxylase, an enzyme coded for by gene CYP27A1, but vitamin D_{2} cannot.
- Ergocalciferol can be directly hydroxylated at position 24 by the enzyme coded for by CYP27A1. This hydroxylation also leads to a greater degree of inactivation: the activity of calcitriol decreases to 60% of original after 24-hydroxylation, whereas ercalcitriol undergoes a 10-fold decrease in activity on conversion to ercalcitetrol.

== Mechanism of action ==
Regulation and mechanism of action of vitamin D

Calcitriol exerts its effects primarily by binding to the vitamin D receptor (VDR), which leads to the upregulation of gene transcription. In the absence of calcitriol, the VDR is mainly located in the cytoplasm of cells. Calcitriol enters cells and binds to the VDR which forms a complex with its coreceptor RXR and the activated VDR/RXR complex is translocated into the nucleus. The VDR/RXR complex subsequently binds to vitamin D response elements (VDRE) which are specific DNA sequences adjacent to genes, numbers estimated as being in the thousands. The VDR/RXR/DNA complex recruits other proteins that transcribe the downstream gene into mRNA which in turn is translated into protein causing a change in cell function.

In addition to calcitriol, other vitamin D metabolites may contribute to vitamin D's biological effects. For example, CYP11A1, an enzyme chiefly known for its role in steroidogenesis, has been found to hydroxylate vitamin D3 at several positions, including C-20, C-22, and C-23, without cleaving the side chain. The resulting metabolites, such as 20-hydroxyvitamin D3 and 20,23-dihydroxyvitamin D3, act as inverse agonists for RORα and RORγ2. This interaction leads to effects such as the downregulation of IL-17 signaling, which influences the immune system. Finally, some effects of vitamin D occur too rapidly to be explained by its influence on gene transcription. For example, calcitriol triggers rapid calcium uptake (within 1–10 minutes) in a variety of cells. These non-genomic actions may involve membrane-bound receptors like PDIA3.

Genes regulated by the vitamin D receptor influence a wide range of physiological processes beyond calcium homeostasis and bone metabolism. They contribute to immune function, cellular signaling, and even blood coagulation, demonstrating the broad impact of vitamin D-regulated genes on human physiology. Examples of these genes are outlined below.

Vitamin D receptor-regulated genes involved in vitamin D metabolism are CYP27B1, which encodes the enzyme that produces active vitamin D. and CYP24A1, which encodes the enzyme responsible for degrading active vitamin D, In the area of calcium homeostasis and bone metabolism, several genes are regulated by vitamin D. These include TNFSF11 (RANKL), essential for bone metabolism; SPP1 (Osteopontin), which is important for bone metabolism; and BGLAP (Osteocalcin), which is involved in bone mineralization. Additional genes include TRPV6, a calcium channel critical for intestinal calcium absorption; S100G (Calbindin-D9k), a calcium-binding protein that enables calcium translocation in enterocytes; ATP2B1 (PMCA1b), a plasma membrane calcium ATPase involved in calcium extrusion from the cell; and the S100A family of genes, which encode calcium-binding proteins involved in various cellular processes.

Vitamin D also plays a role in immune function, influencing genes such as CAMP (Cathelicidin Antimicrobial Peptide), which is involved in innate immune responses; CD14, which participates in innate immune responses; and HLA class II genes, which are important for adaptive immune function. Cytokines such as IL2 and IL12, essential for T cell responses, are also regulated by vitamin D. In the domain of blood coagulation, vitamin D regulates the expression of THBD (Thrombomodulin), a key gene involved in the coagulation process. Vitamin D also affects genes involved in cell differentiation and proliferation, including p21 and p27, which regulate the cell cycle, as well as transcription factors such as c-fos and c-myc, which are involved in cell proliferation.

== Regulation ==
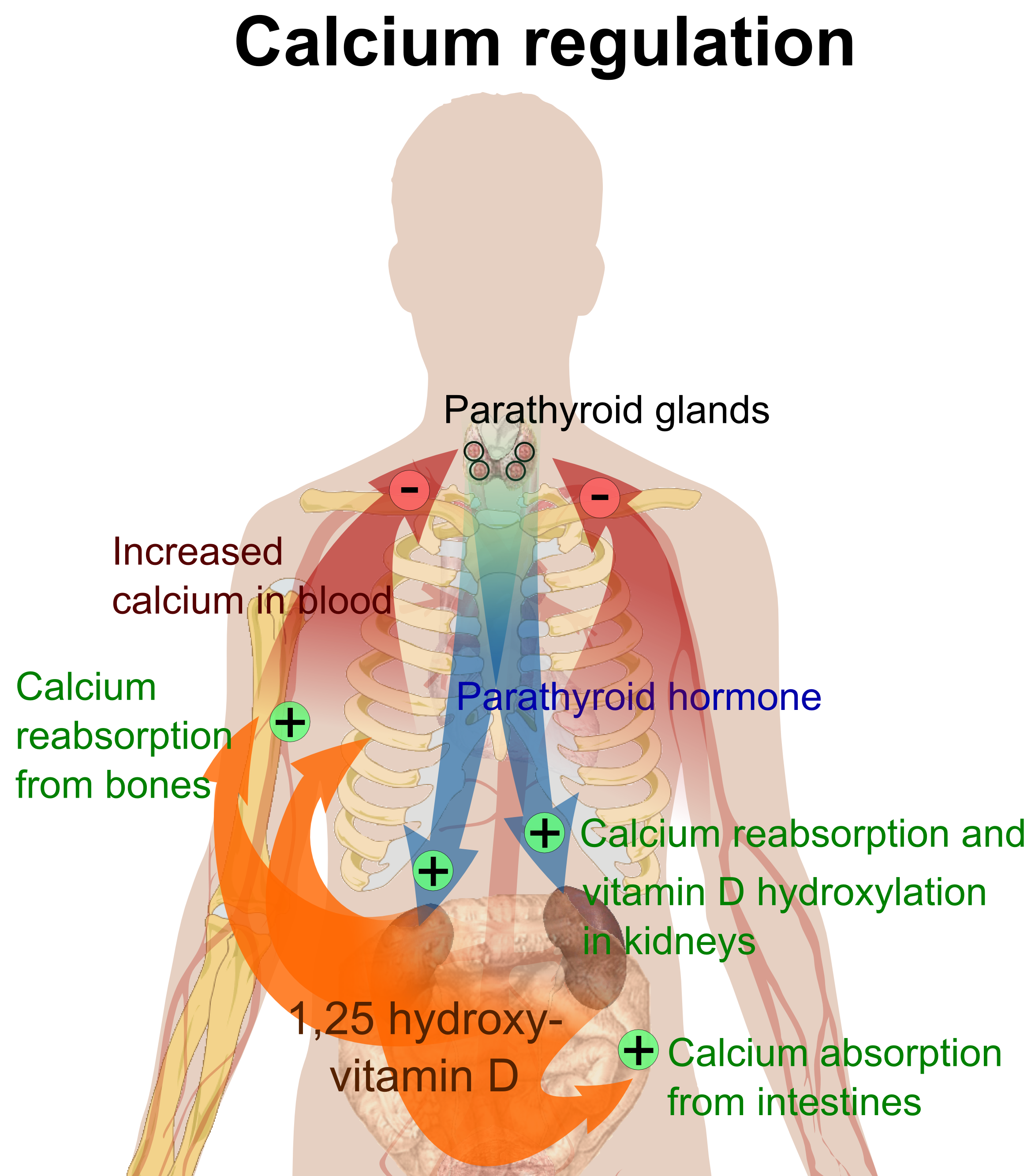
The role of active vitamin D or calcitriol (orange) in calcium metabolism in the human body

=== Negative feedback ===
Calcitriol helps regulate vitamin D levels through a negative feedback mechanism. It strongly upregulates the expression of the enzyme CYP24A1, which inactivates vitamin D. This activation happens through binding of the activated vitamin D receptor (VDR) to two vitamin D response elements (VDREs) in the CYP24A1 gene. VDR also recruits proteins like histone acetyltransferases and RNA polymerase II to enhance this process. At the same time, calcitriol suppresses the production of CYP27B1, another enzyme involved in vitamin D metabolism, by modifying its gene's promoter region through an epigenetic mechanism. Together, these actions help tightly control vitamin D levels in the kidney.

=== Hormonal ===
Vitamin D metabolism is regulated not only by the negative feedback mechanism of calcitriol but also by two hormones: parathyroid hormone (PTH) and fibroblast growth factor-23 (FGF-23). These hormones are essential for maintaining the body's calcium and phosphate balance.

Parathyroid hormone (PTH) regulates serum calcium through its effects on bone, kidneys, and the small intestine.Bone remodeling, a constant process throughout life, involves bone mineral content being released by osteoclasts (bone resorption) and deposited by osteoblasts. PTH enhances the release of calcium from the large reservoir contained in the bones. It accomplishes this by binding to osteoblasts, in this way inhibiting the cells responsible for adding mineral content to bones, thus favoring the actions of osteoclasts. In the kidneys, around 250 mmol of calcium ions are filtered into the glomerular filtrate per day, with the great majority reabsorbed and the remainder excreted in the urine. PTH inhibits reabsorption of phosphate (HPO_{4}^{2−}) by the kidneys, resulting in a decrease in plasma phosphate concentration. Given that phosphate ions form water-insoluble salts with calcium, a decrease in the phosphate concentration in plasma (for a given total calcium concentration) increases the amount of ionized (free) calcium. A third important effect of PTH on the kidneys is stimulation of the conversion of 25-hydroxy vitamin D into 1,25-dihydroxy vitamin D (calcitriol). This form of vitamin D is the active hormone which promotes calcium uptake from the intestine via the action of calbindin. Calcitriol also reduces calcium loss to urine.

Per the diagram, calcitriol suppresses the parathyroid hormone gene, thus creating a negative feedback loop that combines to tightly maintain plasma calcium in a normal range of 2.1-2.6 mmol/L for total calcium and 1.1-1.3 mmol/L for ionized calcium. However, there are also vitamin D receptors in bone cells, so that with serum vitamin D in great excess, osteoclastic bone resorption is promoted regardless of PTH, resulting in hypercalcemia and its symptomology.

Series	Provitamin	Vitamin	25(OH)	1,25(OH)_{2}
D_{3}	7-Dehydrocholesterol^{§}	Cholecalciferol^{ƒ#}	Calcifediol	Calcitriol^{#}
D_{2}	Ergosterol^{§}	Ergocalciferol^{ƒ#}	Ercalcidiol^{§}	Ercalcitriol^{§}
