= Vitamin D3 24-hydroxylase =

Class of enzymes

Identifiers
- EC no.: 1.14.15.16

Databases
- IntEnz: IntEnz view
- BRENDA: BRENDA entry
- ExPASy: NiceZyme view
- KEGG: KEGG entry
- MetaCyc: metabolic pathway
- PRIAM: profile
- PDB structures: RCSB PDB PDBe PDBsum
Search
- PMC: articles
- PubMed: articles
- NCBI: proteins

Vitamin D3 24-hydroxylase (EC 1.14.15.16, CYP24A1) is an enzyme with systematic name calcitriol,NADPH:oxygen oxidoreductase (24-hydroxylating). It catalyses two related chemical reactions:

calcitriol
+ reduced
ferredoxin
O_{2}
H_{2}O
calcitetrol
+ oxidised
ferredoxin

Calcetriol is the active form of vitamin D3 found in the kidneys. The enzyme can further oxidise calcitetrol, leading finally to calcitroic acid.

Calcifediol also acts as a substrate and is oxidised to the corresponding 24-hydroxy compound, secalciferol.

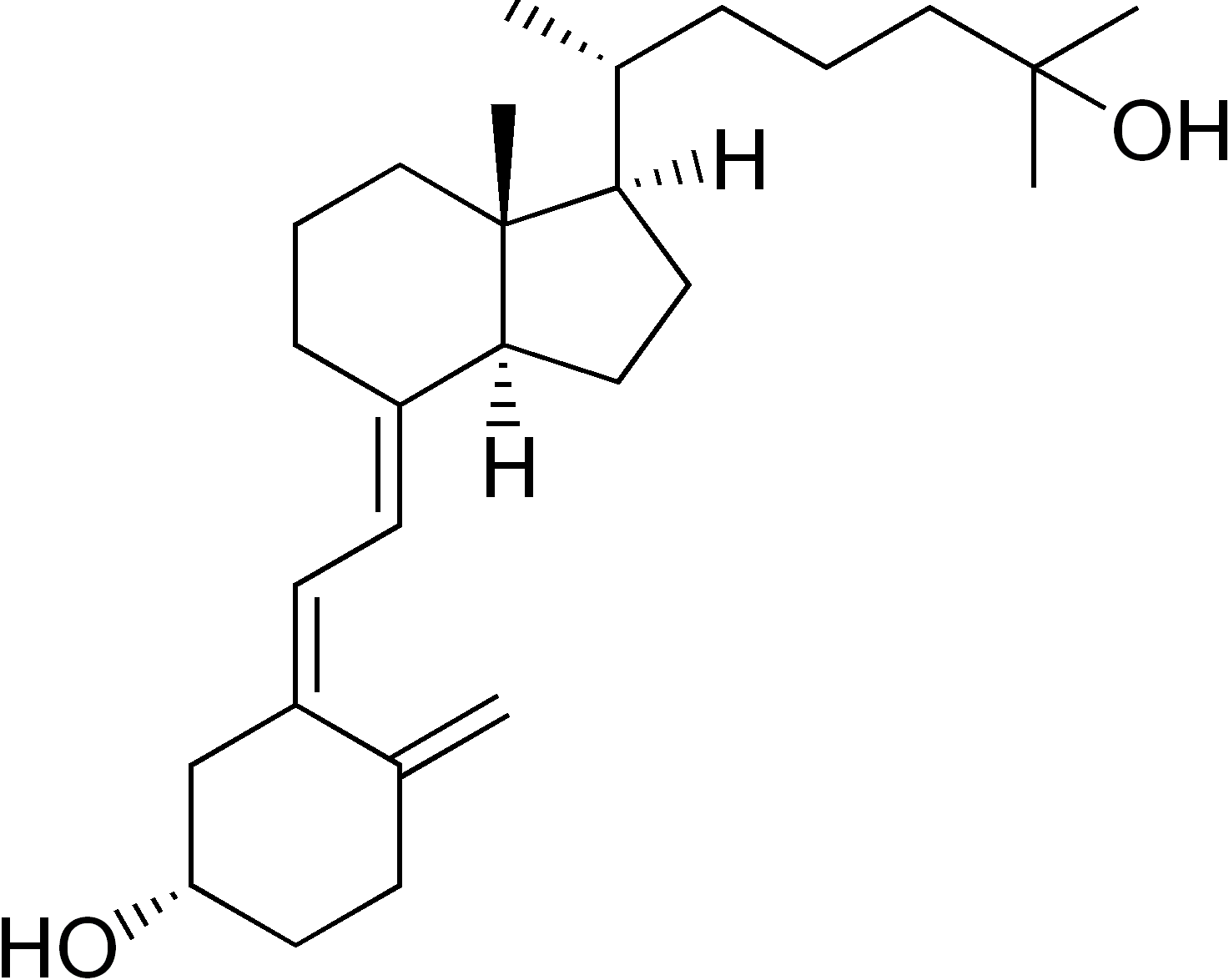
calcifediol
+ reduced
ferredoxin
O_{2}
H_{2}O
secalciferol
+ oxidised
ferredoxin

Vitamin D3 24-hydroxylase is an oxidoreductase that uses molecular oxygen in an oxidation reaction which requires adrenal ferredoxin to transfer electrons from nicotinamide adenine dinucleotide phosphate to its cytochrome P450 active site.
