= Calcipotriol =

Chemical compound

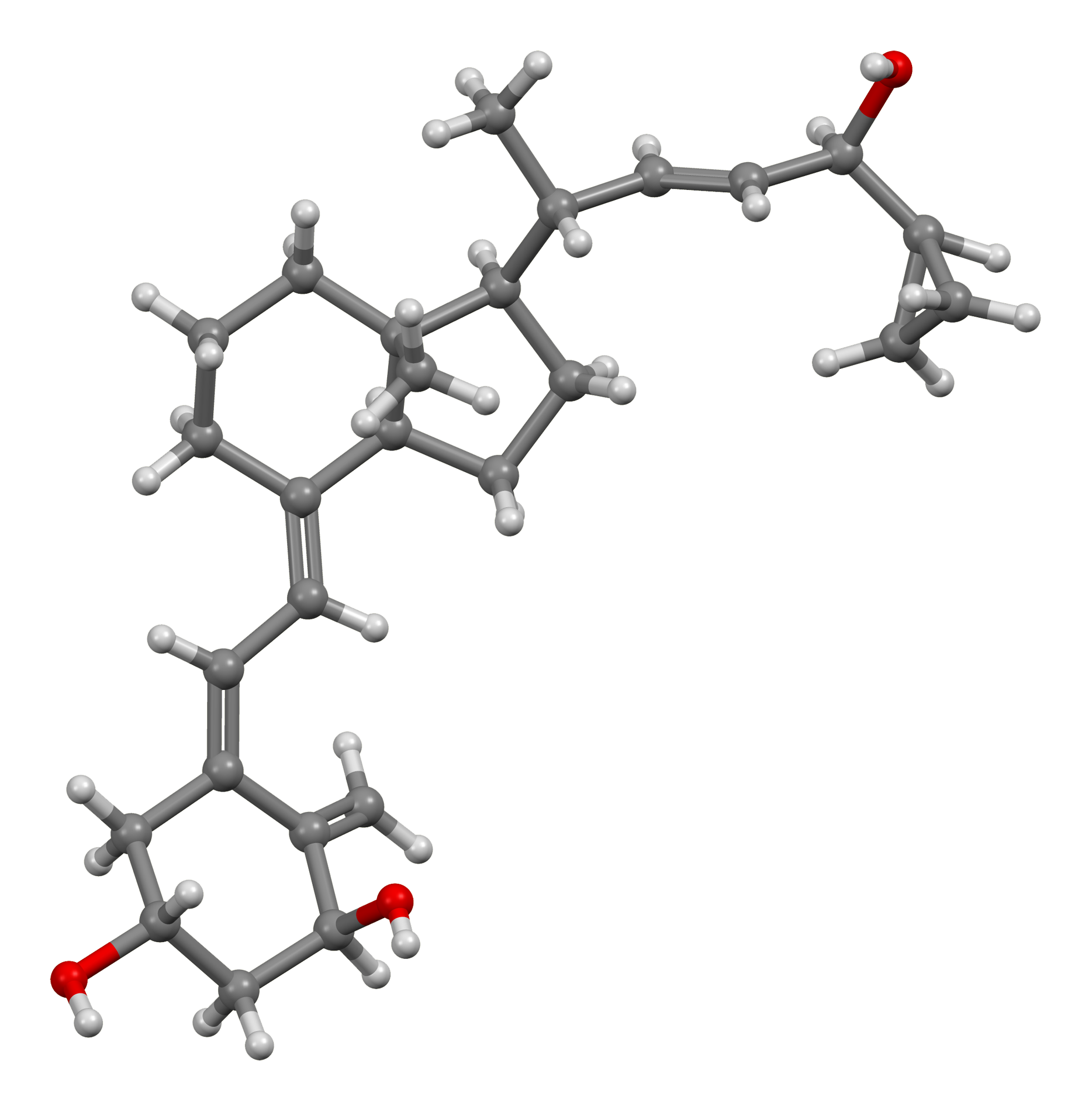

Clinical data
- Trade names: Daivonex, others
- Other names: Calcipotriene, MC 903, calcipotriene (USAN US)
- AHFS/Drugs.com: Monograph
- MedlinePlus: a608018
- License data: US DailyMed: Calcipotriene
- Pregnancy category: AU: B3
- Routes of administration: topical
- ATC code: D05AX02 (WHO)

Legal status
- Legal status: AU: S4 (Prescription only); CA: ℞-only; UK: POM (Prescription only); US: ℞-only

Pharmacokinetic data
- Bioavailability: 5 to 6%
- Metabolism: Liver
- Excretion: Biliary

Identifiers
- IUPAC name: (1R,3S,5E)-5-{2-[(1R,3aS,4Z,7aR)-1-[(2R,3E)-5-cyclopropyl-5-hydroxypent-3-en-2-yl]-7a-methyl-octahydro-1H-inden-4-ylidene]ethylidene}-4-methylidenecyclohexane-1,3-diol
- CAS Number: 112965-21-6
- PubChem CID: 5288783
- IUPHAR/BPS: 2778
- DrugBank: DB02300
- ChemSpider: 4450880
- UNII: 143NQ3779B
- KEGG: D01125
- ChEBI: CHEBI:50749
- ChEMBL: ChEMBL100918
- CompTox Dashboard (EPA): DTXSID0046648
- ECHA InfoCard: 100.119.473

Chemical and physical data
- Formula: C_{27}H_{40}O_{3}
- Molar mass: 412.614 g·mol^{−1}
- 3D model (JSmol): Interactive image
- SMILES: O[C@@H]1CC(\C(=C)[C@@H](O)C1)=C\C=C2/CCC[C@]4([C@H]2CC[C@@H]4[C@@H](/C=C/[C@@H](O)C3CC3)C)C
- InChI: InChI=1S/C27H40O3/c1-17(6-13-25(29)20-8-9-20)23-11-12-24-19(5-4-14-27(23,24)3)7-10-21-15-22(28)16-26(30)18(21)2/h6-7,10,13,17,20,22-26,28-30H,2,4-5,8-9,11-12,14-16H2,1,3H3/b13-6+,19-7+,21-10-/t17-,22-,23-,24+,25-,26+,27-/m1/s1; Key:LWQQLNNNIPYSNX-UROSTWAQSA-N

Calcipotriol, also known as calcipotriene and sold under the brand name Dovonex among others, is a synthetic derivative of calcitriol, an active form of vitamin D. It is used topically in the treatment of psoriasis.

It was patented in 1985 and approved for medical use in 1991. It is on the World Health Organization's List of Essential Medicines.

Calcipotriol is also available with the synthetic corticosteroid betamethasone dipropionate as the fixed-dose combination medication calcipotriol/betamethasone dipropionate for the treatment of plaque psoriasis.

== Medical uses ==
Chronic plaque psoriasis is the chief medical use of calcipotriol. It has also been used successfully in the treatment of alopecia areata.

== Contraindications ==
Hypersensitivity, use on face, hypercalcaemia, or evidence of vitamin D toxicity are the only contraindications for calcipotriol use.

Cautions include exposure to excessive natural or artificial light, due to the potential for calcipotriol to cause photosensitivity.

== Adverse effects ==
Adverse effects by frequency:

Very common (> 10% frequency)

- Burning
- Itchiness
- Skin irritation

Common (1–10% frequency)

- Dermatitis
- Dry skin
- Erythema
- Peeling
- Worsening of psoriasis including facial/scalp
- Rash

Uncommon (0.1–1% frequency)

- Exacerbation of psoriasis

Rare (< 0.1% frequency)

- Allergic contact dermatitis
- Hypercalcaemia
- Photosensitivity
- Changes in pigmentation
- Skin atrophy

== Interactions ==
No drug interactions are known.

== Pharmacology ==
=== Mechanism of action ===
The efficacy of vitamin D receptor modulators (VDRMs) in the treatment of psoriasis was first noticed by the observation of patients receiving various forms of vitamin D in an osteoporosis study. Unexpectedly, some patients who also had psoriasis experienced dramatic reductions in lesion counts. Calcipotriol has been shown to have comparable affinity with calcitriol for the vitamin D receptor (VDR) in vitro, while being less than 1% as active as the calcitriol in regulating calcium metabolism (when given orally to rats), making for an attactive drug candidate. Human trials then demonstarated its safety and effectiveness as a topical medication.

The precise mechanism of VDRMs such as calcipotriol in remitting psoriasis is not well understood. VDR is found inside the cells of many different tissues including the thyroid, bone, kidney, and T cells of the immune system. It is a nuclear receptor that directly binds to DNA and enables the transcription of genes. It has long been known that activating the vitamin D receptor (VDR) leads to decreased cell differentiation and proliferation in general, in lymphocytes specifically a suppression of activity. T cells are known to play a role in psoriasis, and it is thought that the VDR activation helps calm the overactive T cells.

VDRMs also have a direct effect on the skin cells. In mouse studies, topical administration of calcipotriol and various other VDRMs to the ear and dorsal skin led to a dose-dependent increase in the production of the epithelial cell-derived cytokine TSLP by keratinocytes, and triggered atopic dermatitis at high concentrations. This process is also believed to be dependent the transcriptional activities of VDR. As psoriasis is typically thought to be partially driven by Th1/Th17 inflammatory cytokines, calcipotriol treatment at appropriate concentrations may alleviate psoriasis symptoms by repressing Th1/Th17 inflammation through TSLP production, which is linked to a Th2 response. This has not yet been confirmed.

=== Pharmacokinetics ===
A small amount of topically applied calcipotriol is absorbed through the skin into the blood. This causes a very small but detectable effect on calcium homeostasis. (At the time of its approval, topical calcipotriol was thought to have no effect on calcium metabolism based on the then-available clinical data. This small systemic effect was discovered only after it was approved using improved measurement techniques.)

When absorbed into blood, calcipotriol undergoes rapid hepatic metabolism. Calcipotriol is metabolized to MC1046 (the α,β−unsaturated ketone analog), which is subsequently metabolized to its primary metabolite, the saturated ketone analog MC1080. MC1080 is then slowly metabolized to calcitroic acid.

== Society and culture ==
=== Brand names ===
It is sold under the brand name Dovonex in the United States, Daivonex outside North America, and Psorcutan in Germany.

Series	Provitamin	Vitamin	25(OH)	1,25(OH)_{2}
D_{3}	7-Dehydrocholesterol^{§}	Cholecalciferol^{ƒ#}	Calcifediol	Calcitriol^{#}
D_{2}	Ergosterol^{§}	Ergocalciferol^{ƒ#}	Ercalcidiol^{§}	Ercalcitriol^{§}
