= Anthony W. Norman =

American biochemist (1938–2019)

- Born: January 1938; Ames, Iowa, U.S.
- Died: June 14, 2019 (aged 81)
- Education: Oberlin College B.S. (1959), University of Wisconsin, Madison M.S (1961), Ph.D (1963)
- Known for: Key discoveries in the biochemistry and mechanisms of action of Vitamin D
- Spouse: Helen Henry
- Scientific career
- Fields: biochemistry, biomedical science, Vitamin D
- Workplaces: University of California, Riverside, University of California, Los Angeles, University of Utrecht, Katholieke Universiteit Leuven, University of California, San Francisco
- Doctoral advisor: H. F. Deluca

Anthony W. Norman (January 1938 – June 14, 2019) was a professor emeritus of biochemistry and biomedical sciences at the University of California, Riverside and one of the world's foremost experts on vitamin D.

== Vitamin D Research ==
Norman's research was in the area of cellular and molecular endocrinology, where he was internationally known for his breakthroughs in the study of vitamin D. This included the mechanisms of action of the steroid hormone 1,25-dihydroxycholecalciferol, vitamin D structure-function relationships, and actions of the vitamin D receptor (VDR).

In 1967, Norman's lab discovered that vitamin D is converted into a steroid hormone by the body. In 1969 he determined that vitamin D receptors (VDR) were present in the intestine.

In 1971 the Norman laboratory reported the chemical structure of the active form of vitamin D to be 1,25-dihydroxycholecalciferol (which is also known as 1α,25-dihydroxyvitamin D3, and 1α,25-(OH)_{2}D_{3}).

In 1972, Norman in collaboration with Dr. Jack Coburn at the UCLA medical school treated the first uremic patients with the steroid hormone, produced in the Norman laboratory.

Norman and others, including Dr. Cedric Garland of UC San Diego, in 2007/8 made the recommendation that the daily intake of vitamin D for adults be revised to 2000 international units.

== Vitamin D workshops ==
One of his most recognised achievements was the organisation of 15 international Vitamin D Workshops which usually ran every three years from 1973 to 2012.

== Personal life ==
His wife, Helen Henry, predeceased him in 2018. He had three children and nine grandchildren.

== Selected honors and awards ==
- Presidential chair, biochemistry department, UCR 7/1/99 - 2009
- Graduate Student Mentor Award, UCR, June 2005
- Fellow of American Association for the Advancement of Science, 1995
- William F. Neuman Award, American Society for Bone and Mineral Research, 1995
- MERIT Award from National Institutes of Health, 1986-1993 (standard award period is five years)
- Osborne & Mendel Award, American Institute of Nutrition, 1990
- Faculty Research Lecturer, University of California, Riverside, 1982
- Prix Andre Lichtwitz, INSERM, Paris, France, 1981
- Ernst Oppenheimer Award, Endocrine Society, 1977
- Mead Johnson Award, American Institute of Nutrition, 1977
- Fulbright Fellowship, 1970/71

== Other Achievements ==
- Chair of the UCR Department of Biochemistry, July 1976 - June 1981
- Dean of UCR Biomedical Sciences Program, July 1986 - Sept. 1991.
- Chair of the UCR Faculty Academic Senate from Sept. 2008 through August 2010.
- Faculty athletic representative for the UC Riverside Athletics Department through Sept. 2010.

== Publications ==
Norman has been an author on over 800 scientific publications dating back to 1959.

A special issue on vitamin D dedicated to Norman's memory was published in 2021 with contributions from many of his collaborators and other notable scientists.
