= Alfacalcidol =

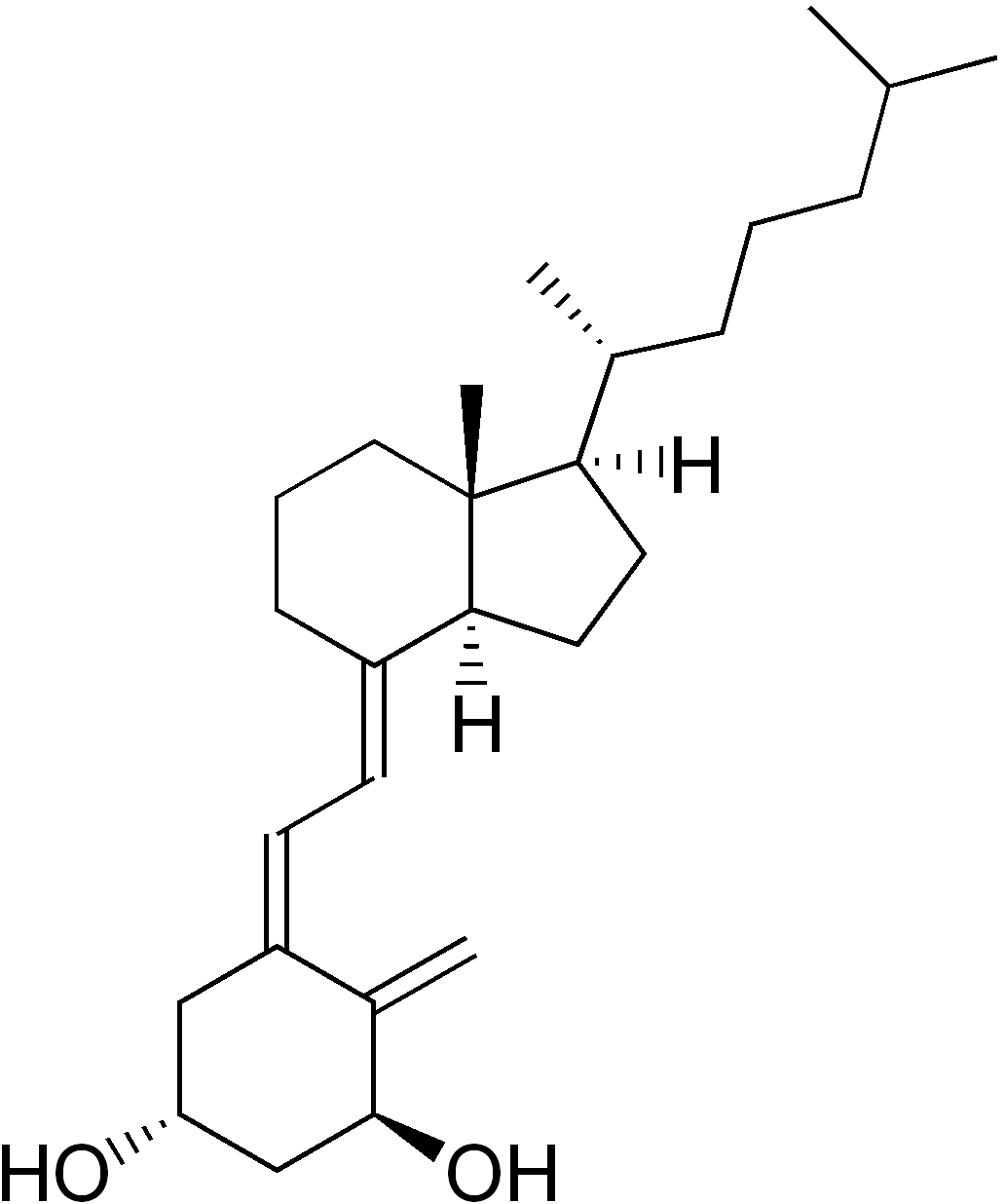

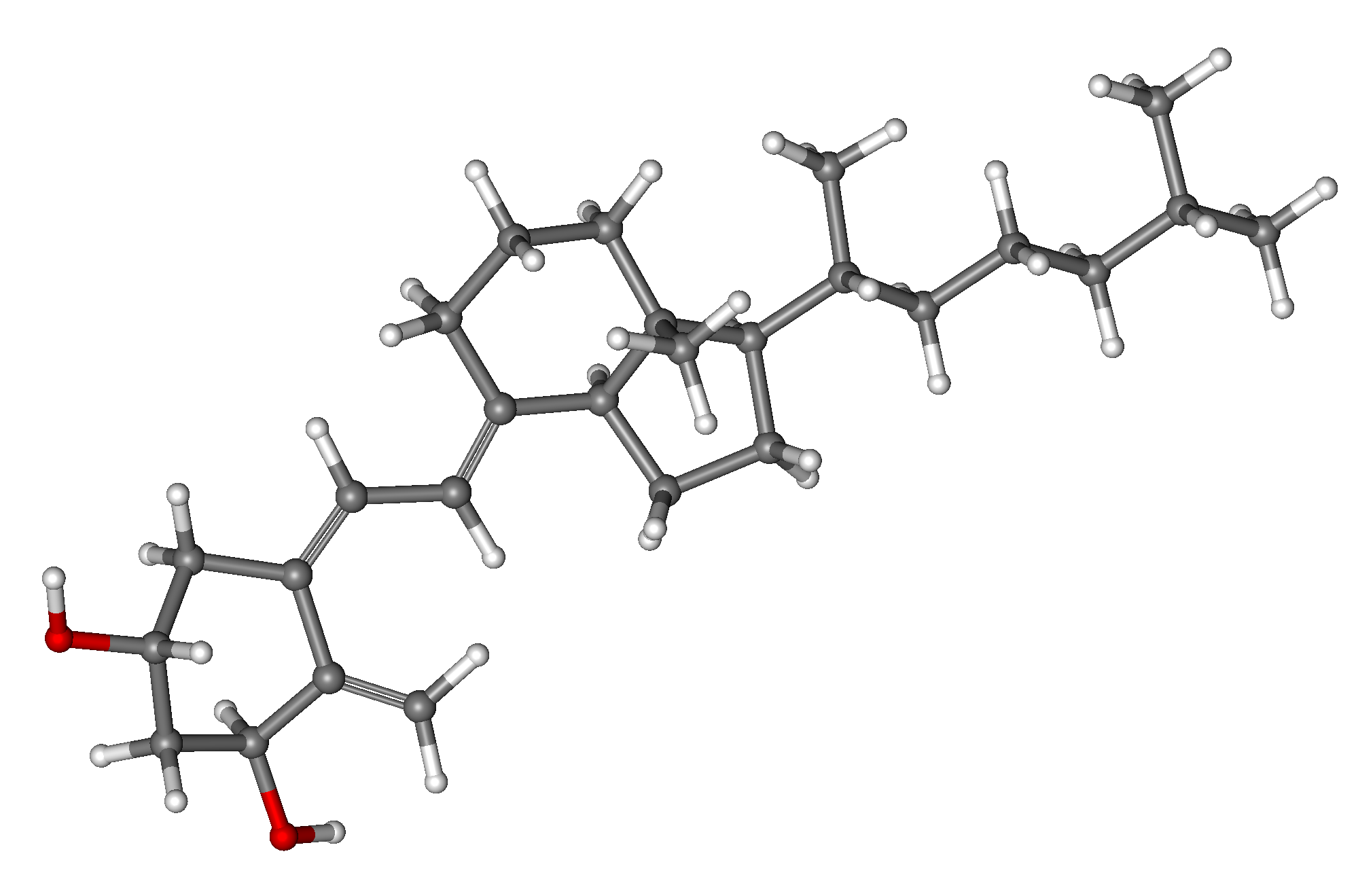

Names
- Preferred IUPAC name (1R,3S,5Z)-4-Methylidene-5-[(2E)-2-{(1R,3aS,7aR)-7a-methyl-1-[(2R)-6-methylheptan-2-yl]octahydro-4H-inden-4-ylidene}ethylidene]cyclohexane-1,3-diol
- Other names Alphacalcidol; 1-Hydroxycholecalciferol

Identifiers
| CAS Number | 41294-56-8 |
| 3D model (JSmol) | Interactive image |
| ChEBI | CHEBI:31186 |
| ChEMBL | ChEMBL32540 |
| ChemSpider | 4445376 |
| DrugBank | DB01436 |
| ECHA InfoCard | 100.050.253 |
| KEGG | D01518 |
| PubChem CID | 5282181 |
| UNII | URQ2517572 |
| CompTox Dashboard (EPA) | DTXSID0022569 |
- InChI: InChI=1S/C27H44O2/c1-18(2)8-6-9-19(3)24-13-14-25-21(10-7-15-27(24,25)5)11-12-22-16-23(28)17-26(29)20(22)4/h11-12,18-19,23-26,28-29H,4,6-10,13-17H2,1-3,5H3/b21-11+,22-12-/t19-,23-,24-,25+,26+,27-/m1/s1 Key: OFHCOWSQAMBJIW-AVJTYSNKSA-N; InChI=1/C27H44O2/c1-18(2)8-6-9-19(3)24-13-14-25-21(10-7-15-27(24,25)5)11-12-22-16-23(28)17-26(29)20(22)4/h11-12,18-19,23-26,28-29H,4,6-10,13-17H2,1-3,5H3/b21-11+,22-12-/t19-,23-,24-,25+,26+,27-/m1/s1 Key: OFHCOWSQAMBJIW-AVJTYSNKBM
- SMILES: O[C@@H]1CC(\C(=C)[C@@H](O)C1)=C\C=C2/CCC[C@]3([C@H]2CC[C@@H]3[C@H](C)CCCC(C)C)C

Properties
| Chemical formula | C_{27}H_{44}O_{2} |
| Molar mass | 400.64 g/mol |
| Melting point | 136 °C (277 °F; 409 K) |
| Solubility in water | 0.016 g/100 mL |

Pharmacology
| ATC code | A11CC03 (WHO) |
| License data | EU EMA: by INN |
| Legal status | UK: POM (Prescription only); EU: Rx-only |
- Except where otherwise noted, data are given for materials in their standard state (at 25 °C [77 °F], 100 kPa). verify (what is ?) Infobox references

Alfacalcidol (or 1-hydroxycholecalciferol) is an analogue of vitamin D used for supplementation in humans and as a poultry feed additive.

Alfacalcidol has a weaker impact on calcium metabolism and parathyroid hormone levels than calcitriol; but significant effects on the immune system, including regulatory T cells. It is considered to be a more useful form of vitamin D supplementation, mostly due to its much longer half-life and lower kidney load. It is the most commonly prescribed vitamin D metabolite for patients with end stage renal disease, given that impaired renal function alters the ability to carry out the second hydroxylation step required for the formation of the physiologically active form of vitamin D, 1,25-dihydroxyvitamin D3. Alfacalcidol is an active vitamin D3 metabolite, and therefore does not require the second hydroxylation step in the kidney.

== Mechanism of action ==
Action of alfacalcidol in vitamin D_{3} metabolism

Alfacalcidol is a prodrug that is rapidly metabolized in the liver to the active form, calcitriol. As it is already 1α-hydroxylated, it does not require activation in the kidney as cholecalciferol does. After calcitriol binds to its intracellular receptor (vitamin D receptor, VDR), the synthesis of a calcium ion-binding protein increases. The compound enhances intestinal absorption of calcium and phosphate, regulates bone mineralization, and promotes calcium reabsorption in the renal tubules.

Alfacalcidol prevents deficiency symptoms associated with impaired physiological 1α-hydroxylation of cholecalciferol or calcifediol in the kidneys, particularly in cases of chronic renal insufficiency. Alfacalcidol is not naturally present in the human body and is rapidly converted into calcitriol in the liver.

== Synthesis ==
The multi-step synthesis of alfacalcidol is illustrated in the following reaction sequence:

== Properties ==
Alfacalcidol is practically insoluble in water, slightly soluble in 96% ethanol, and soluble in fatty oils. It is sensitive to air, heat, and light. In solution, a reversible isomerization to pre-alfacalcidol occurs, depending on temperature and duration. Both compounds are biologically active.

== History ==
Alfacalcidol was patented in 1971 and approved for medical use in 1978.

== Trade names ==
Pharmaceutical trade names include AlphaD and One-Alpha.

== Other animals ==
Used as a poultry feed additive, it prevents tibial dyschondroplasia and increases phytate bioavailability.
