= CYP24A1 =

Mammalian enzyme protein found in humans

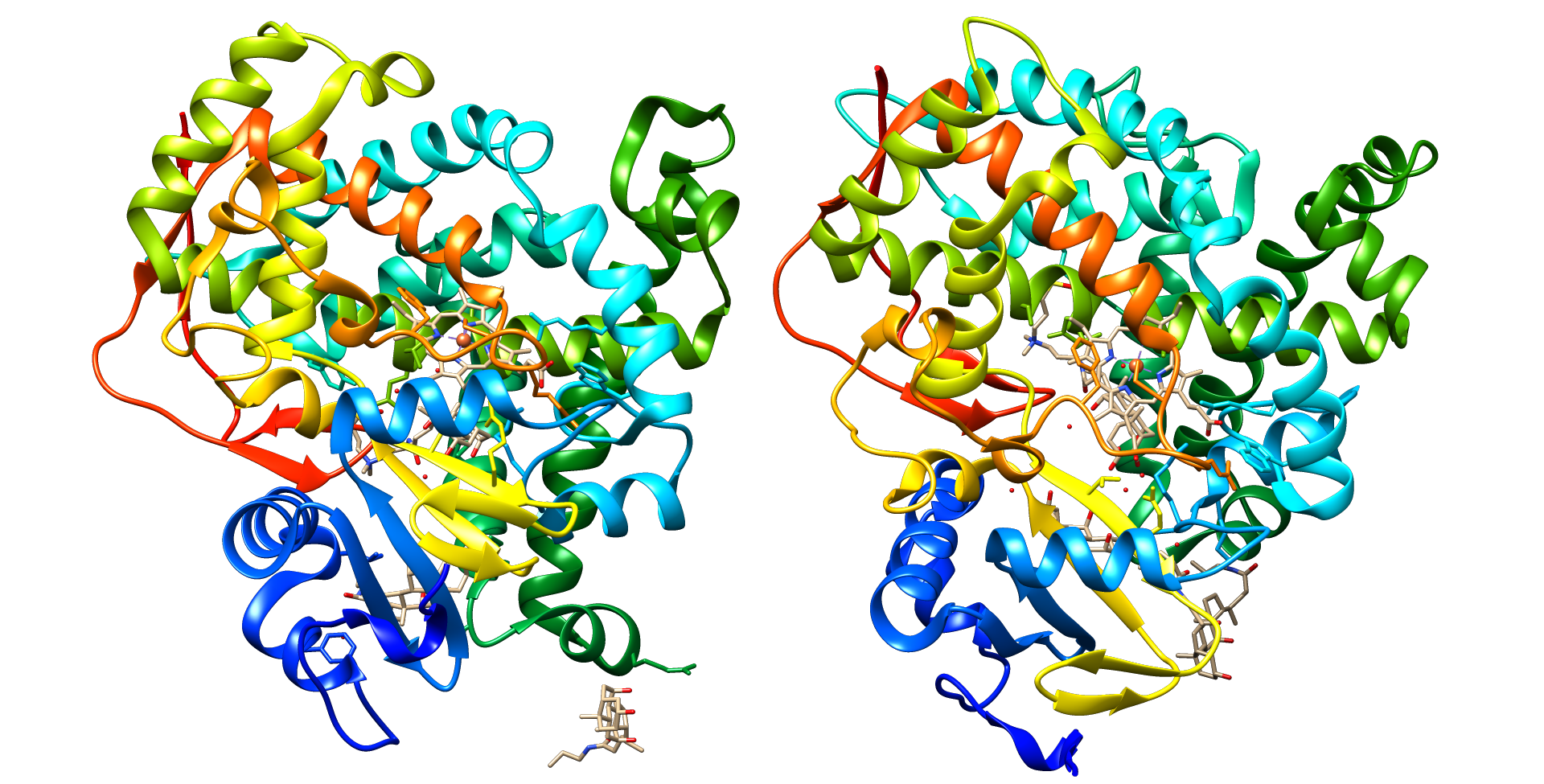

Identifiers
- Aliases: CYP24A1, CP24, CYP24, HCAI, P450-CC24, cytochrome P450 family 24 subfamily A member 1, HCINF1
- External IDs: OMIM: 126065; MGI: 88593; GeneCards: CYP24A1
Available structures
PDB	Ortholog search: PDBe RCSB
PDB	List of PDB id codes 3K9V, 3K9Y
Enzyme activity
EC #	BRENDA	ExPASy	KEGG	MetaCyc
1.14.15.16	↗	↗	↗	↗

Gene location (Human)
Chr.	Chromosome 20 (human)
Band	20q13.2	Start	54,153,446 bp
Band	20q13.2	End	54,173,986 bp

Gene location (Mouse)
Chr.	Chromosome 2 (mouse)
Band	2 H3|2 91.91 cM	Start	170,324,628 bp
Band	2 H3|2 91.91 cM	End	170,339,065 bp
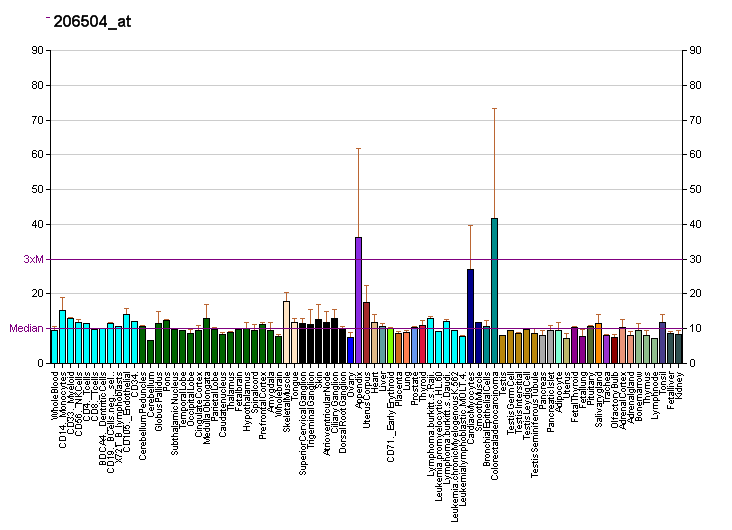
RNA expression pattern
Bgee	Human / Mouse (ortholog); Top expressed in: olfactory zone of nasal mucosa; secondary oocyte; testicle; mucosa of urinary bladder; human kidney; epithelium of nasopharynx; gonad; gingival epithelium; palpebral conjunctiva; tonsil / Top expressed in: right kidney; human kidney; renal cortex; proximal tubule; corneal stroma; embryo; epiblast; axial skeleton; efferent ductule; lactiferous gland; More reference expression data
BioGPS	More reference expression data
Gene ontology
Molecular function	iron ion binding; 25-hydroxycholecalciferol-24-hydroxylase activity; metal ion binding; monooxygenase activity; heme binding; oxidoreductase activity, acting on paired donors, with incorporation or reduction of molecular oxygen; oxidoreductase activity; 1-alpha,25-dihydroxyvitamin D3 24-hydroxylase activity
Cellular component	plasma membrane; nucleoplasm; mitochondrion; nucleus; mitochondrial outer membrane
Biological process	response to vitamin D; vitamin D metabolic process; vitamin metabolic process; osteoblast differentiation; vitamin D catabolic process; vitamin D receptor signaling pathway
Sources:Amigo / QuickGO
Orthologs
Databases	NCBI: entry; OMA: entry
Species	Human	Mouse
Entrez	1591	13081
Ensembl	ENSG00000019186	ENSMUSG00000038567
UniProt	Q07973	Q64441
RefSeq (mRNA)	NM_000782; NM_001128915	NM_009996
RefSeq (protein)	NP_000773; NP_001122387	NP_034126
Location (UCSC)	Chr 20: 54.15 – 54.17 Mb	Chr 2: 170.32 – 170.34 Mb
PubMed search
- Wikidata
View/Edit Human	View/Edit Mouse

Cytochrome P450 family 24 subfamily A member 1 (abbreviated CYP24A1) is a member of the cytochrome P450 superfamily of enzymes encoded by the CYP24A1 gene. It is a mitochondrial monooxygenase which catalyzes reactions including:

- 24-hydroxylation of calcitriol (1,25-dihydroxyvitamin D_{3}) and calcidiol. This is otherwise known as the vitamin D3 24-hydroxylase activity (EC 1.14.15.16). It also performs several follow-up steps leading up to calcitroic acid.
- 23-hydroxylation of calcitriol and several following steps to form a lactone

== Function ==
CYP24A1 is an enzyme expressed in the mitochondrion of humans and other species. It catalyzes hydroxylation reactions which lead to the degradation of 1,25-dihydroxyvitamin D_{3}, the physiologically active form of vitamin D. Hydroxylation of the side chain produces calcitroic acid and other metabolites which are excreted in bile.

CYP24A1 was identified in the early 1970s and was first thought to be involved in vitamin D metabolism as the renal 25-hydroxyvitamin D3-24-hydroxylase, modifying calcifediol (25-hydroxyvitamin D) to produce 24,25-dihydroxycholecalciferol (24,25-dihydroxyvitamin D). Subsequent studies using recombinant CYP24A1 showed that it could also catalyze multiple other hydroxylation reactions at the side chain carbons known as C-24 and C-23 in both 25-OH-D_{3} and the active hormonal form, 1,25-(OH)_{2}D_{3}. It is now considered responsible for the entire five-step, 24-oxidation pathway from 1,25-(OH)_{2}D_{3} producing calcitroic acid.

Human CYP24A1 also is able to catalyze another pathway which starts with 23-hydroxylation of 1,25-(OH)_{2}D_{3} and culminates in 1,25-(OH)_{2}D_{3}-26,23-lactone. This capability is not found in rat CYP24A1.

The side chains of the ergocalciferol (vitamin D_{2}) derivatives, 25-OH-D_{2} and 1,25-(OH)_{2}D_{2}, are also hydroxylated by CYP24A1.

The structure of CYP24A1 is highly conserved between different species although the balance of functions can differ. Alternatively spliced transcript variants encoding different isoforms have been found for this gene.

This enzyme plays an important role in calcium homeostasis and the vitamin D endocrine system through its regulation of the level of vitamin D.

=== Interactive pathway map ===
Click on genes, proteins and metabolites below to link to respective articles. (Note: The interactive pathway map can be edited at WikiPathways: "VitaminDSynthesis_WP1531".)

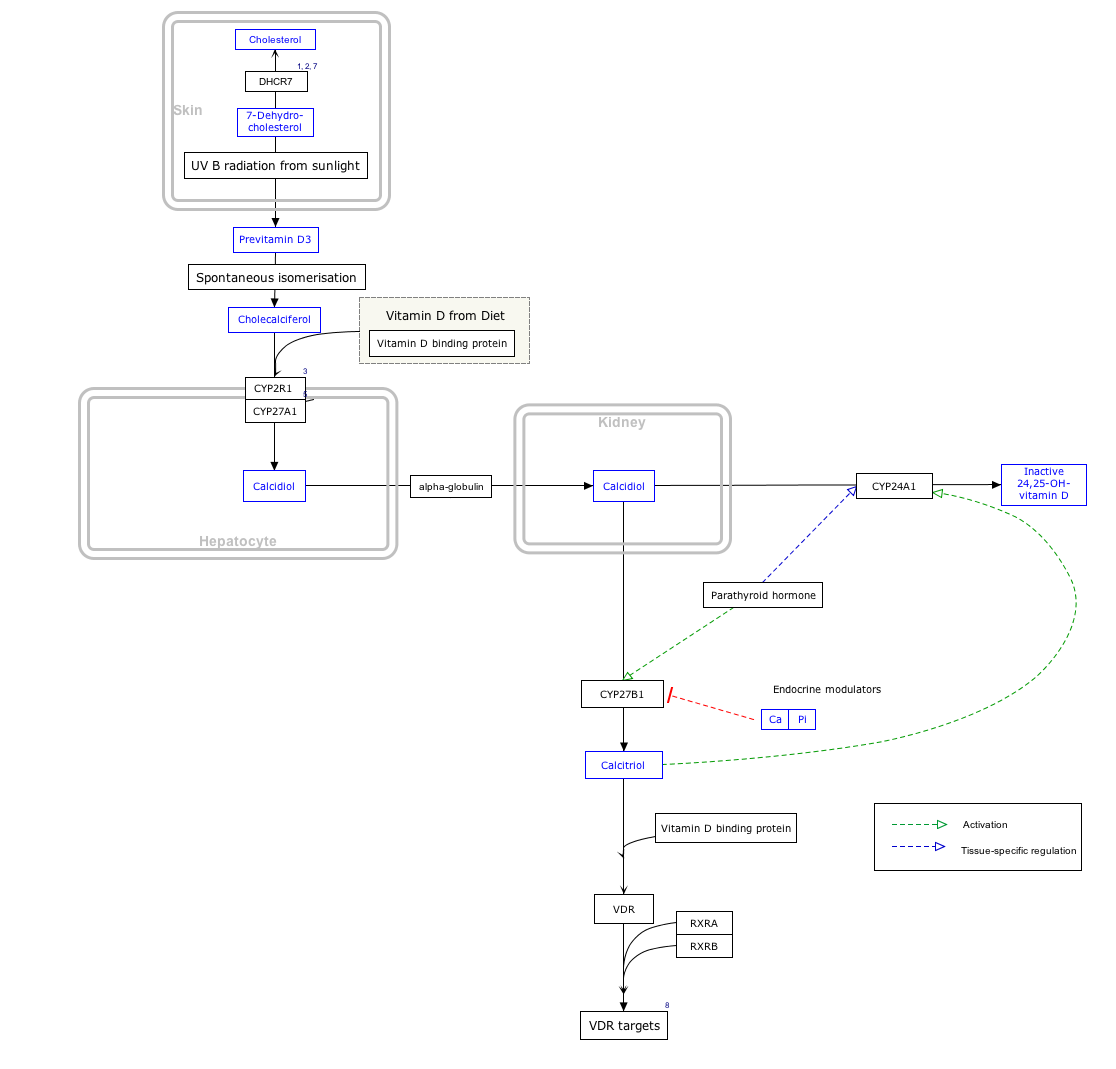

Vitamin D Synthesis Pathway (view / edit)

== Regulation ==
CYP24A1 is expressed in tissues which are considered targets for vitamin D, including kidney, intestine and bone. Transcription of the CYP24A1 gene is markedly inducible by agonists such as 1,25-(OH)_{2}D_{3} binding to the vitamin D receptor. The gene has a strong, positive vitamin D response element in the promoter. Through regulation of CYP24A1 expression, a negative feedback control system is created to limit the effects of 1,25-(OH)_{2}D_{3}.

PTH and FGF23 also regulate CYP24A1 gene expression. Additionally, it is translationally regulated via IRES within the 5'UTR, which is responsive to an inflammatory environment.

== Clinical relevance ==
Loss-of-function in CYP24A1 is thought to be one of the causes of severe infantile hypercalcemia. However, increasingly patients are also being diagnosed in adulthood, often when they present with hypercalcaemia. Patients with mutations of the CYP24A1 gene have elevated serum calcium concentrations, elevated serum 1,25-(OH)_{2}D, suppressed PTH concentrations, hypercalciuria, nephrocalcinosis, nephrolithiasis, and sometimes reduced bone density. Variations in the gene may also be found in people with renal stones.

== See also ==
- Vitamin D
- CYP27B1
- Calcium in biology
