= Calcitroic acid =

Names
- IUPAC name (3R)-3-[(1R,3aR,4E,7aR)- 4-[(2Z)-2-[(3R,5R)-3,5- Dihydroxy-2-methylene-cyclohexylidene]ethylidene] -7a-methyl-2,3,3a,5,6,7-hexahydro-1H -inden-1-yl]butanoic acid

Identifiers
CAS Number	71204-89-2
3D model (JSmol)	Interactive image
ChemSpider	4947800
PubChem CID	6443842
UNII	F7KIE52YT0
CompTox Dashboard (EPA)	DTXSID60904030
- InChI: InChI=1/C23H34O4/c1-14(11-22(26)27)19-8-9-20-16(5-4-10-23(19,20)3)6-7-17-12-18(24)13-21(25)15(17)2/h6-7,14,18-21,24-25H,2,4-5,8-13H2,1,3H3,(H,26,27)/b16-6+,17-7-/t14-,18+,19-,20+,21-,23-/m1/s1 Key: MBLYZRMZFUWLOZ-FEUSBDLHBT
- SMILES: O=C(O)C[C@@H](C)[C@H]3CC[C@H]2C(=C\C=C1/C(=C)[C@H](O)C[C@@H](O)C1)\CCC[C@@]23C

Properties
Chemical formula	C_{23}H_{34}O_{4}
Molar mass	374.514
- Except where otherwise noted, data are given for materials in their standard state (at 25 °C [77 °F], 100 kPa). Infobox references

Calcitroic acid (1α-hydroxy-23-carboxy-24,25,26,27-tetranorvitamin D_{3}) is a major metabolite of 1α,25-dihydroxyvitamin D_{3} (calcitriol). Calcitriol is the active form of vitamin D3, important for the fortification of bone through the formation and regulation of calcium in the body. Calcitroic acid has very low vitamin D activity and is produced by the liver and kidney as a result of CYP24A1 inactivation. Considered the "final" metabolite of vitamin D, it is water-soluble and excreted in bile.

Around 1980, scientists first reported the isolation of calcitroic acid from the aqueous extract of radioactively treated animals' livers and intestines. Subsequent researches confirmed calcitroic acid to be a part of enterohepatic circulation. The compound has been prepared in the laboratory.

== Metabolism ==
In the liver and the kidneys, calcitriol (1,25-(OH)_{2}D_{3}) is hydroxylated by the enzyme CYP24A1 (calcitriol 24-hydroxylase) to yield a variety of less-active products, including calcitetrol (1,24,25-(OH)_{3}D_{3}) and 1,25-(OH)_{2}D_{3}-26,23-lactone (the latter happens in humans, but not rats). This enzyme is thought to be the major route to inactivate vitamin D metabolites.

Calcitetrol can have its sidechain trimmed by CYP24A1 to yield the 24,25,26,27-tetranor product. This product is converted to calcitroic acid by oxidizing its C23 position to yield the "23-carboxy" modification, again by CYP24A1. An analogous reaction starting with 24,25-Dihydroxycholecalciferol (24,25-(OH)_{2}D_{3}) can yield calcioic acid, which differs from calcitroic acid by not having the 1α-hydroxy group. During this other reaction, some intermediates can be 1α-hydroxylated by CYP27A1 to switch to the track leading up to calcitroic acid. CYP24A1 alone cannot convert 24,25-(OH)_{2}D_{3} to calcitroic acid, but perfused rat kidney tissue can.

Perfused kidney tissue can also convert the analogous ercalcitriol (1,25-(OH)_{2}D_{2}) to calcitroic acid, though the process by which the D_{2} sidechain is converted to a D_{3} one is unknown. Rats also convert 22-dihydroercalcitriol (1,25-(OH)_{2}D_{4}) to calcitroic acid, again through unknown means of sidechain modification.

== Biological activity ==
In vitro, calcitroic acid binds to the vitamin D receptor (VDR) at an IC_{50} of 6.8 μM, more than 10^{4} times higher than the 0.4 nM of calcitriol. This means that it has much lower affinity to the VDR than calcitriol. Nevertheless, at extremely high concentrations beyond what is reasonable in vivo, calcitronic acid can activate the VDR and induce gene transcription. In this respect it is more active than all of the other 25(OH)D metabolites. The methyl ester is slightly more active at the VDR than the acid itself, with ~2× lower IC_{50}.

Both the acid and its methyl ester produces a weak vitamin D-like effect in live animals, more apparent at higher doses, and easily dwarfed by any amount of calcitriol.

== Structure ==
Using X-ray crystallography, scientists have determined the structure of zebrafish VDR bound to calcitronic acid. The structure is analogous to VDR bound to calcitriol, suggesting that calcitronic acid is likely to act as an agonist (activator) of VDR. The shorter sidechain of calcitroic acid (compared to calcitriol) causes it to contact VDR through a hydrogen bond with His333 and a single water molecule. This is in contrast with the more complete contact via His333 and His423 shown by calcitriol.
