= Tacalcitol =

Chemical compound

Clinical data
- Other names: (1α,24R)-1,24-Dihydroxyvitamin D_{3}
- AHFS/Drugs.com: International Drug Names
- Routes of administration: Topical
- ATC code: D05AX04 (WHO)

Identifiers
- IUPAC name: (1S,3R,5Z,7E,24R)-9,10-secocholesta-5,7,10-triene-1,3,24-triol
- CAS Number: 57333-96-7
- PubChem CID: 5283734
- IUPHAR/BPS: 2780
- ChemSpider: 4446823
- UNII: C2W72OJ5ZU
- ChEBI: CHEBI:32176
- ChEMBL: ChEMBL340361
- CompTox Dashboard (EPA): DTXSID90905111
- ECHA InfoCard: 100.220.855

Chemical and physical data
- Formula: C_{27}H_{44}O_{3}
- Molar mass: 416.646 g·mol^{−1}
- 3D model (JSmol): Interactive image
- SMILES: O[C@@H]1CC(\C(=C)[C@@H](O)C1)=C\C=C2/CCC[C@]3([C@H]2CC[C@@H]3[C@H](C)CC[C@@H](O)C(C)C)C
- InChI: InChI=1S/C27H44O3/c1-17(2)25(29)13-8-18(3)23-11-12-24-20(7-6-14-27(23,24)5)9-10-21-15-22(28)16-26(30)19(21)4/h9-10,17-18,22-26,28-30H,4,6-8,11-16H2,1-3,5H3/b20-9+,21-10-/t18-,22-,23-,24+,25-,26+,27-/m1/s1; Key:BJYLYJCXYAMOFT-RSFVBTMBSA-N

Tacalcitol (1,24-dihydroxyvitamin D_{3}) is a synthetic vitamin D_{3} analog. Tacalcitol is marketed under several names, including Curatoderm and Bonalfa.

It is on the World Health Organization's List of Essential Medicines.

== Mechanism ==
Tacalcitol reduces excessive cell turnover in the epidermis by interacting with vitamin D receptors on keratinocytes.

== Uses ==
It is usually prescribed by a general practitioner or dermatologist for the treatment of psoriasis, chronic chapped lips and other severe dry skin conditions because of its ability to reduce excessive skin cell turnover. It is available as an ointment or lotion.

It has also been used for vitiligo and Hailey-Hailey disease.
