= 24,25-Dihydroxycholecalciferol =

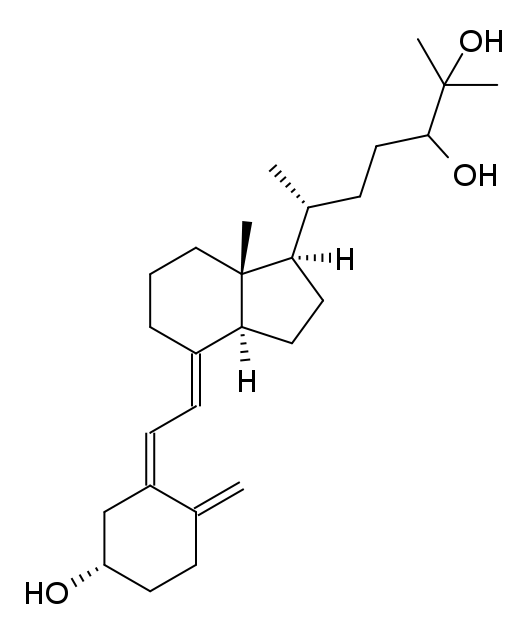

Names
- IUPAC name (6R)-6-[(1R,3aS,4E,7aR)-4-[(2Z)-2-[(5S)-5-hydroxy-2-methylenecyclohexylidene]ethylidene]-7a-methyl-2,3,3a,5,6,7-hexahydro-1H-inden-1-yl]-2-methylheptane-2,3-diol
- Other names: 24,25-dihydroxyvitamin D_{3}; 24-hydroxycalcifediol; 24-hydroxycalcidiol

Identifiers
CAS Number	40013-87-4
3D model (JSmol)	Interactive image
ChEMBL	ChEMBL47183
ChemSpider	4939193
ECHA InfoCard	100.049.754
PubChem CID	6434253
UNII	0AXX2V8L5Z
CompTox Dashboard (EPA)	DTXSID501028177
- InChI: InChI=1S/C27H44O3/c1-18-8-12-22(28)17-21(18)11-10-20-7-6-16-27(5)23(13-14-24(20)27)19(2)9-15-25(29)26(3,4)30/h10-11,19,22-25,28-30H,1,6-9,12-17H2,2-5H3/b20-10+,21-11-/t19-,22+,23-,24+,25?,27-/m1/s1 Key: FCKJYANJHNLEEP-SRLFHJKTSA-N; InChI=1/C27H44O3/c1-18-8-12-22(28)17-21(18)11-10-20-7-6-16-27(5)23(13-14-24(20)27)19(2)9-15-25(29)26(3,4)30/h10-11,19,22-25,28-30H,1,6-9,12-17H2,2-5H3/b20-10+,21-11-/t19-,22+,23-,24+,25?,27-/m1/s1 Key: FCKJYANJHNLEEP-SRLFHJKTBM
- SMILES: O[C@@H]1CC(\C(=C)CC1)=C\C=C2/CCC[C@]3([C@H]2CC[C@@H]3[C@H](C)CCC(O)C(O)(C)C)C

Properties
Chemical formula	C_{27}H_{44}O_{3}
Molar mass	416.63 g/mol
- Except where otherwise noted, data are given for materials in their standard state (at 25 °C [77 °F], 100 kPa). verify (what is ?) Infobox references

24,25-Dihydroxycholecalciferol, also known as 24,25-dihydroxyvitamin D_{3} (24,25-(OH)_{2}D_{3}), are metabolites closely related to calcitriol, the active form of vitamin D_{3}. Like vitamin D_{3} itself and calcifediol (25-OH D_{3}), it is inactive as a hormone both in vitro and in vivo. It was first identified in 1972 in the laboratory of Hector DeLuca and Michael F. Holick.

It can be further distinguished into two epimers (24R)-hydroxycalcidiol and (24S)-hydroxycalcidiol (abbreviated as 24(R),25-(OH)_{2}D_{3} and 24(S),25-(OH)_{2}D_{3}). The (24R) epimer is also known as secalciferol.

== Formation ==
24(R),25-(OH)_{2}D_{3} is formed from 25-hydroxyvitamin D_{3} by the action of CYP24A1 (25-hydroxyvitamin D3-24-hydroxylase). CYP24A1 appears to be "a multicatalytic enzyme catalyzing most, if not all, of the reactions in the C-24/C-23 pathway of 25-OH-D_{3} metabolism." 24(S),25-(OH)_{2}D_{3} is derived from reduction of 25-OH-24-oxo-D3, a metabolite of 24(R),25-(OH)_{2}D_{3}.

The proportion of serum 24,25-(OH)_{2}D_{3} that is the 24(R) isomer was found to be 96.8% in rats under standard conditions, decreasing to 89.5% several days after injection with a large dose of vitamin D_{3}.

== Biological role ==
It has been proposed that 24,25-(OH)_{2}D_{3} is a metabolite of 25-OH-D_{3} which is destined for excretion.

It is not known whether the compound have any physiologically significant activity. Some evidence of a possible receptor has been obtained.

The 24(R) form is a substrate for CYP27B1, which converts it to calcitriol.

== Interactive pathway map ==
Click on genes, proteins and metabolites below to link to respective articles. (Note: The interactive pathway map can be edited at WikiPathways: "VitaminDSynthesis_WP1531".)

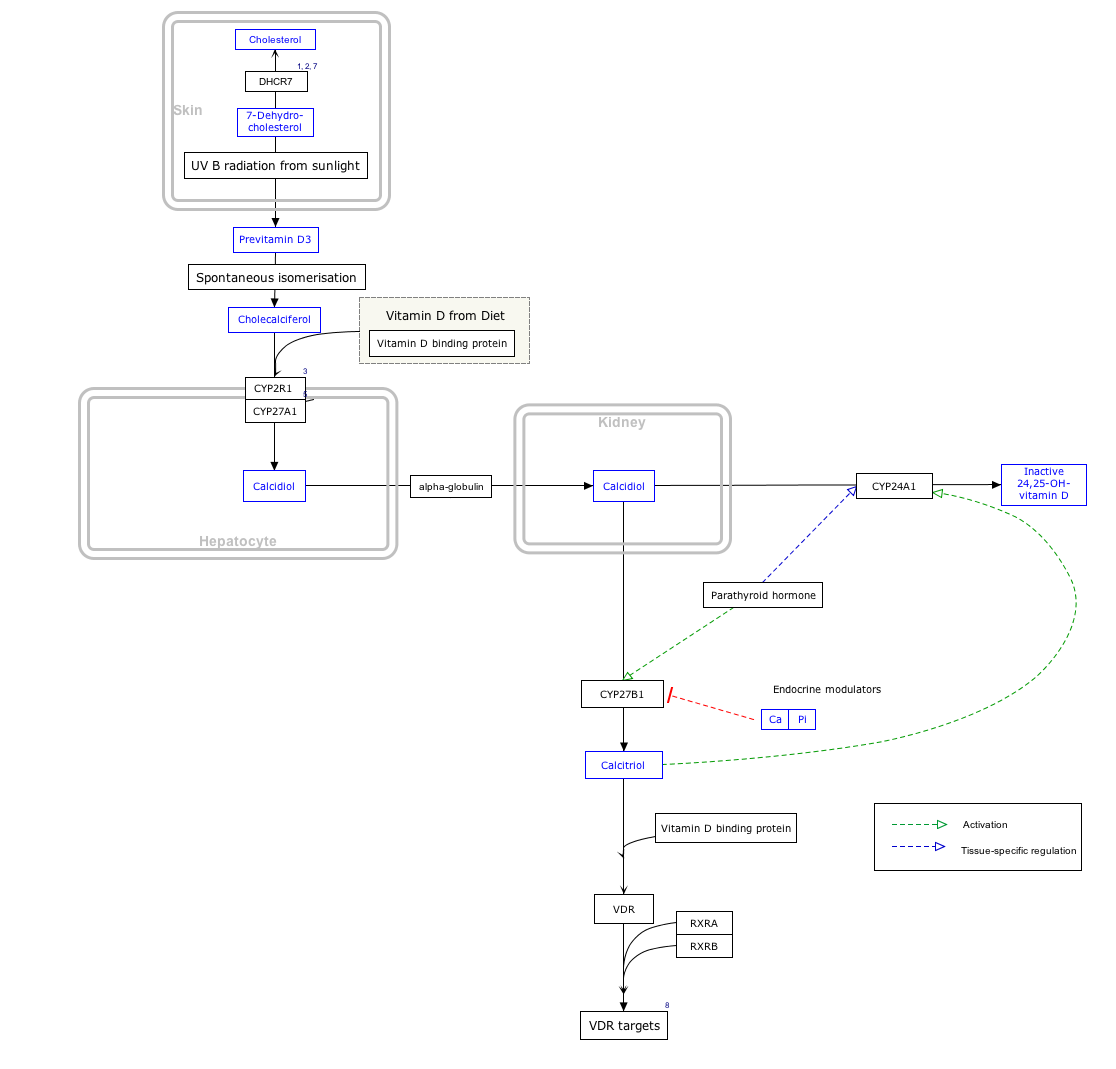

Vitamin D Synthesis Pathway (view / edit)

== Other articles ==
- Mata-Granados, J. M.; Luque De Castro, M. D.; Quesada Gomez, J. M. (2008). "Inappropriate serum levels of retinol, α-tocopherol, 25 hydroxyvitamin D3 and 24,25 dihydroxyvitamin D3 levels in healthy Spanish adults: Simultaneous assessment by HPLC". Clinical Biochemistry. 41 (9): 676–680. doi:10.1016/j.clinbiochem.2008.02.003. PMID 18313404.
