= Vitamin D (disambiguation) =

Vitamin D is a group of fat-soluble prohormones.

Vitamin D may also refer to:

== Vitamin D vitamers ==
- Ergocalciferol (vitamin D_{2})
- Cholecalciferol (vitamin D_{3})
- 22-Dihydroergocalciferol (vitamin D_{4})
- Vitamin D_{5}

=== Other uses ===
- Vitamin D (musician), American DJ and record producer
- Vitamin D (album), an album by Datsik
- "Vitamin D" (song), a song by Ludacris and Ty Dolla Sign
- "Vitamin D" (Glee), an episode of the television series Glee

== See also ==
- Calcifediol (25-hydroxyvitamin D or 25(OH)D), an indicator of vitamin D status in the blood
- Calcitriol (1,25-dihydroxyvitamin D or 1,25(OH)_{2}D), the active hormonal form of vitamin D
- Calcitroic acid (1,24,25-trihydroxyvitamin D), the major metabolite of calcitriol
- Vitamin D and respiratory tract infections
- Vitamin D and neurology
- Vitamin D toxicity, hypervitaminosis D, toxicity caused by the ingestion of large doses of vitamin D
- Vitamin D deficiency, hypovitaminosis D, a condition with deficiency of vitamin D
- Vitamin D-binding protein, encoded by the GC gene, binds vitamin D in blood
- Vitamin D receptor (VDR), or calcitriol receptor, the intracellular receptor for vitamin D
- Vitamin D response element (VDRE) is a DNA sequence found in the promoter region of vitamin D regulated genes
- Vitamin D-dependent calcium-binding proteins, including calbindins and S100G
- Vitamin D resistant rickets, X-linked hypophosphatemia, a form of rickets for which ingestion of vitamin D is relatively ineffective
