= Vitamin D and neurology =

Effects of vitamin D on the nervous system

Vitamin D
- Drug class
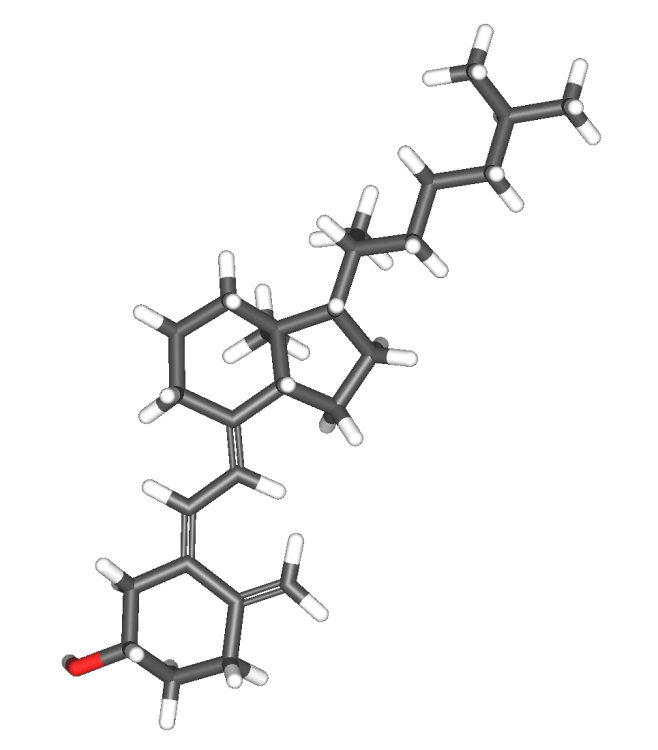
- Cholecalciferol (D_{3})

Class identifiers
- Use: Rickets, osteoporosis, vitamin D deficiency
- ATC code: A11CC
- Biological target: vitamin D receptor

Clinical data
- Drugs.com: MedFacts Natural Products

External links
- MeSH: D014807

Legal status

Vitamin D shows associations between low levels of vitamin D, or hypovitaminosis D, and neuropsychiatric disorders, including Alzheimer's disease, autism, epilepsy, multiple sclerosis, Parkinson's disease, and schizophrenia.

== Physiology ==
Vitamin D (the inactive version) is mainly from two forms: vitamin D_{3} and vitamin D_{2}. Vitamin D_{3}, or cholecalciferol, is formed in the skin after exposure to sunlight or ultra violet radiation or from D_{3} supplements or fortified food sources. Vitamin D_{2}, or ergocalciferol, is obtained from D_{2} supplements or fortified food sources. These two forms of vitamin D are metabolized in the liver and stored as 25-hydroxyvitamin D. Before biological use, the storage form must be converted into an active form. One common active form is 1,25-dihydroxyvitamin D. The term vitamin D in this article means cholecalciferol, ergocalciferol, 25-hydroxyvitamin D, and the active forms. The role of vitamin D is best characterized as enabling calcium absorption and regulating calcium homeostasis. Vitamin D also play a role in phosphate absorption.

== Hypovitaminosis D ==
Hypovitaminosis D is any deficiency of vitamin D. A vitamin D blood-concentration standard for diagnosing hypovitaminosis D does not exist. In the past, hypovitaminosis D was defined by blood concentrations lower than 20 ng/mL. However, in more recent literature many researchers have considered 30 ng/mL to be an insufficient concentration of vitamin D. Subnormal levels of vitamin D are usually caused by poor nutrition or a lack of sun exposure. Risk factors for hypovitaminosis D include premature birth, darker skin pigmentation, obesity, malabsorption, and older age.

== Vitamin D and the central nervous system ==
=== Location in the central nervous system ===
The brain requires the use of many neurosteroids to develop and function properly. These molecules are often identified as one of many common substances including thyroid hormones, glucocorticoids, and sex hormones. However in recent studies, throughout the brain and spinal fluid, vitamin D has begun to surface as one of these neurosteroids.

- Metabolites: Several vitamin D metabolites are found in cerebral spinal fluid and have the ability to cross the blood brain barrier. This is similar to many of the previously known neurosteroids. These vitamin D metabolites include 25-hydroxyvitamin D_{3}, 1,25-dihydroxyvitamin D_{3}, and 24,25-dihydroxyvitamin D_{3}. Derivatives of these metabolites are highly expressed in the substantia nigra and the hypothalamus. These two brain structures are responsible for motor functions and linking the nervous system to the endocrine system, respectively. The expression of these metabolite derivatives in these areas suggests that these structures have the ability to synthesize these products from vitamin D.

Location of brain regions related to vitamin D

- Receptors: In addition to vitamin D metabolites, vitamin D receptor (VDR) proteins are also found in the brain; more specifically, they are found in the cerebellum, thalamus, hypothalamus, basal ganglia, and hippocampus. The highest density of VDR is in substantia nigra, one of the primary areas of dopamine production. Another significant portion of the receptors is located in the hypothalamus (supra optic and paraventricular nuclei) and external granule cell layer of the prefrontal cortex. VDR are also found in the hippocampus (CA1 and CA2) areas, in slightly lower densities.

=== Function in the central nervous system ===
The presence of vitamin D, its activating enzyme, and VDR in the brain leads researchers to question what role vitamin D plays in the brain. Research suggests that vitamin D may function as a modulator in brain development and as a neuroprotectant. In recent studies, vitamin D has exhibited an association with the regulation of nerve growth factor (NGF) synthesis. NGF is responsible for the growth and survival of neurons. This relationship has also been studied in embryonic and neonatal rats. Developmental vitamin D deficient (DVD) rats have decreased levels of neurotrophic factors, increased mitosis, and decreased apoptosis. These findings suggest that vitamin D potentially affects the development of neurons as well as their maintenance and survival. Current research is underway investigating whether vitamin D is a factor contributing to normal brain functioning.

== Vitamin D and neurological disorders ==
Hypovitaminosis D is associated with several neuropsychiatric disorders including dementia, Parkinson's disease, multiple sclerosis, epilepsy, and schizophrenia. There are several proposed mechanisms by which hypovitaminosis D may impact these disorders. One of these mechanisms is through neuronal apoptosis. Neuronal apoptosis is the programmed death of the neurons. Hypovitaminosis D causes this specific apoptosis by decreasing the expression of cytochrome C and decreasing the cell cycle of neurons. Cytochrome C is a protein that promotes the activation of pro-apoptotic factors. A second mechanism is through the association of neurotrophic factors like nerve growth factor (NGF), brain-derived neurotrophic factor (BDNF), glial cell line-derived neurotrophic factor (GDNF). These neurotrophic factors are proteins that are involved in the growth and survival of developing neurons and they are involved in the maintenance of mature neurons.

=== Dementia: Alzheimer's disease ===
"Dementia" is a term referring to neurodegenerative disorders characterized by a loss of memory and such brain functions as executive functioning. Included under this umbrella term is Alzheimer's disease. Alzheimer's disease is characterized by the loss of cortical functions like language and motor skills. Patients with Alzheimer's disease exhibit an extreme shrinkage of the cerebral cortex and hippocampus with an enlargement of the ventricles. In several recent studies, higher vitamin D levels have been associated with lower risks of developing Alzheimer's disease. Alzheimer's disease is associated with a decrease in vitamin D receptors in the Cornu Ammonius areas (CA 1& 2) of the hippocampus. The hippocampus is a portion of the limbic system responsible for memory and spatial navigation. Additionally, certain VDR haplotypes were detected with increased frequency in patients with Alzheimer's disease while other VDR haplotypes were detected with decreased frequency, suggesting that specific haplotypes may increase or decrease risk of developing Alzheimer's. It is hypothesized that this lack of VDRs in the hippocampus prevents the proper functioning (ie. memory) of this structure.

=== Parkinson's disease ===
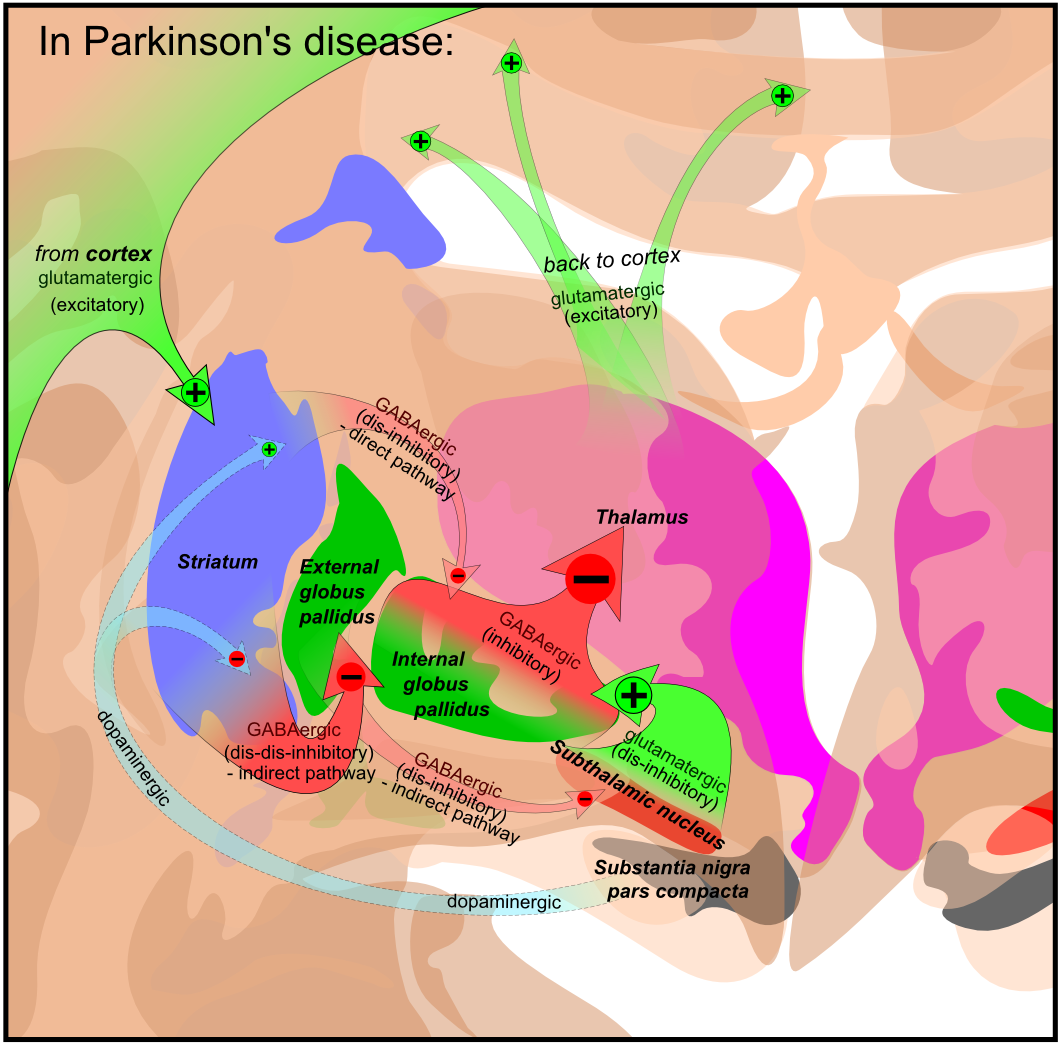
This image depicts the circuits of the basal ganglia in patients with Parkinson's disease. Pay close attention to the role of the substantia nigra and the dopaminergic neurons

Parkinson's disease is characterized by progressive deterioration of movement and coordination. Patients with Parkinson's disease lose dopaminergic (DA) neurons in the substantia nigra, a part of the brain that plays a central role in such brain functions as reward, addiction, and coordination of movement. Studies suggest that low vitamin D levels could play a role in PD, and in one case report, vitamin D supplements lessened parkinsonian symptoms. In a study of vitamin D receptor knockout mice, mice without VDR exhibited motor impairments similar to impairments seen in patients with Parkinson's disease. One proposed mechanism linking vitamin D to Parkinson's disease involves the Nurr 1 gene. Vitamin D deficiency is associated with decreased expression of the Nurr1 gene, a gene responsible for development of DA neurons. It is therefore plausible that a lack of Nurr1 expression leads to impaired DA neuronal development. Failure to form DA neurons would lead to lower dopamine concentrations in the basal ganglia. Additionally, rats lacking Nurr1 exhibited hypoactivity followed by death shortly after birth.Non-motor symptoms may be influenced by vitamin D deficiency; for example, orthostatic hypotension has been inversely associated with decreased vitamin D levels.

=== Multiple sclerosis ===
Multiple sclerosis (MS) is an autoimmune disease causing demyelination within the central nervous system. In the central nervous system, there are many cells encased in a fatty coating called the myelin sheath. This sheath allows for informational signals to be transmitted at greater speeds down through the cell. In multiple sclerosis, this sheath deterioration causes a slower transmission of nerve signals. This ultimately results in severe motor deficits.

The prevalence of MS is associated with latitude. In this image, red indicates a high prevalence of MS while yellow indicates a lower prevalence

There is a well-established global correlation between multiple sclerosis and latitude; there is a higher multiple sclerosis prevalence in northeastern regions than in the south and western regions. At the same time, on average higher vitamin D levels are found in the south and western regions than in the northeast. Based on this correlation and other studies, the higher intake of vitamin D is associated with a lower risk for MS. Research has also shown that in relation to geological position (latitude), patients who later developed MS saw an earlier age of onset of symptoms in the more northern latitudes than in the southern hemisphere. The mechanism for this association is not fully established, however, a proposed mechanism involves inflammatory cytokines. Hypovitaminosis D is associated with an increase in proinflammatory cytokines and decrease in anti-inflammatory cytokines. The increase in these specific cytokines is associated with the degradation of the myelin sheath.

The increase of vitamin D into the body has shown to increase the amount of anti-inflammatory cytokines and molecules within the body. As this research progresses, the understanding grows of how vitamin D and its complementary receptor (vitamin D receptor, VDR) are incorporated in expressing and regulating 900 genes within our bodies, as well as how this pair interacts genetically. For example genes can be upregulated or downregulated when the highly active form of vitamin D, 1,25-alpha dihydroxyvitamin D_{3} binds to the VDR on chromosomal regions of gene expression that manage the balance or ratio between differentiating immune cells into Th_{1} and Th_{2} T cell proteins. The upregulation of Th_{2} T cell proteins, like IL-4 and TGF-β, are the main focus of some research which aims to minimize the effects seen in the model organism disease EAE (experimental autoimmune encephalomyelitis), studied for its similarities to multiple sclerosis. Though this study of gene regulation is observed within murine models, it focuses on MS orthologs to humans and research has shown that it may also help to manage: rheumatoid arthritis (RA), type 1 diabetes (T1D), systemic lupus erythematosus (SLE), cardiovascular disease (CVD), and other chronic inflammatory diseases.

=== Epilepsy and seizures ===
Seizures are disturbances in brain activities where neurons fire abnormally. Epilepsy is a condition in which a person experiences repeated seizures. In one small pilot study (Christiansen, 1974, BMJ), vitamin D supplementation, but not placebo treatment was associated with decreased seizures. Vitamin D regulates proconvulsant and anticonvulsant factors. More specifically, Vitamin D is involved in the down regulation of cytokine IL-6, which is a proconvulsant. Additionally, vitamin D is associated with the up regulation of neurotrophic factors: GDNF and TN3. These neurotrophic factors are anticonvulsant. In the absence or depletion of vitamin D, research suggests that the proconvulsant factors will not be down regulated and the anticonvulsant factors will not be up regulated. It is hypothesized that this disturbance in homeostasis may lower the threshold for convulsive activity. Lastly, vitamin D has also been shown to promote the expression of calcium binding proteins that are known to possess anti-epileptic properties.

=== Schizophrenia ===
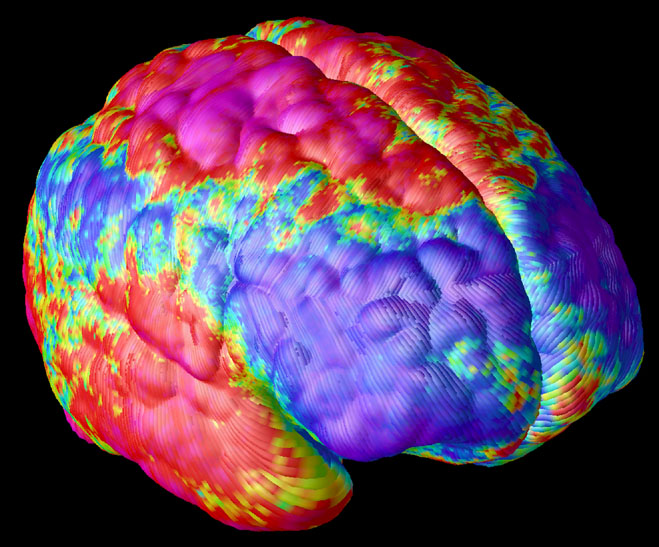
Map of deficits in neural tissue throughout the human brain in a patient with schizophrenia. The most deficient areas are magenta, while the least deficient areas are blue.

Schizophrenia is a neuropsychiatric disorder characterized by the inability to perceive reality and think clearly. This condition has genetic and developmental causes. In this disorder, vitamin D is believed to be involved in the development of the brain during the gestational period. Gestational vitamin D deficiency in rats is associated with reduced levels of neurotrophic factors NGF and GDNF. NGF is the nerve growth factor, which is involved in neurotransmission. GDNF is the glial cell lined derived neurotrophic factor, which is involved in the survival and differentiation of dopaminergic neurons.

=== Other hypovitaminosis D associations ===
Hypovitaminosis D has also been associated with many other conditions, including both neurological and non neurological conditions. These include but are not limited to autism, diabetes, and osteoporosis.

== Future research: cause or effect ==
Hypovitaminosis D has been associated with many neurological conditions. However, an actual mechanism of action for each of the conditions has yet to be solidified. Many researchers have questioned whether the depletion of vitamin D actually causes these disorders or if vitamin D deficiency is a symptom of these disorders.

== See also ==
- Hypervitaminosis D
