= CYP2R1 =

Mammalian protein found in Homo sapiens

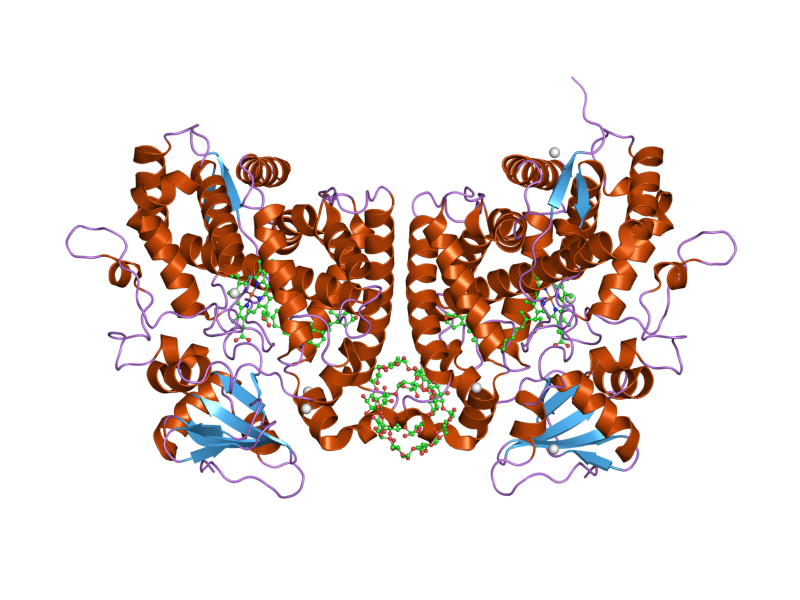

Identifiers
- Aliases: CYP2R1, cytochrome P450 family 2 subfamily R member 1
- External IDs: OMIM: 608713; MGI: 2449771; GeneCards: CYP2R1
Available structures
PDB	Ortholog search: PDBe RCSB
PDB	List of PDB id codes 3C6G, 3CZH, 3DL9
Enzyme activity
EC #	BRENDA	ExPASy	KEGG	MetaCyc
1.14.14.24	↗	↗	↗	↗

Gene location (Human)
Chr.	Chromosome 11 (human)
Band	11p15.2	Start	14,877,440 bp
Band	11p15.2	End	14,892,231 bp

Gene location (Mouse)
Chr.	Chromosome 7 (mouse)
Band	7|7 F1	Start	114,148,917 bp
Band	7|7 F1	End	114,162,207 bp
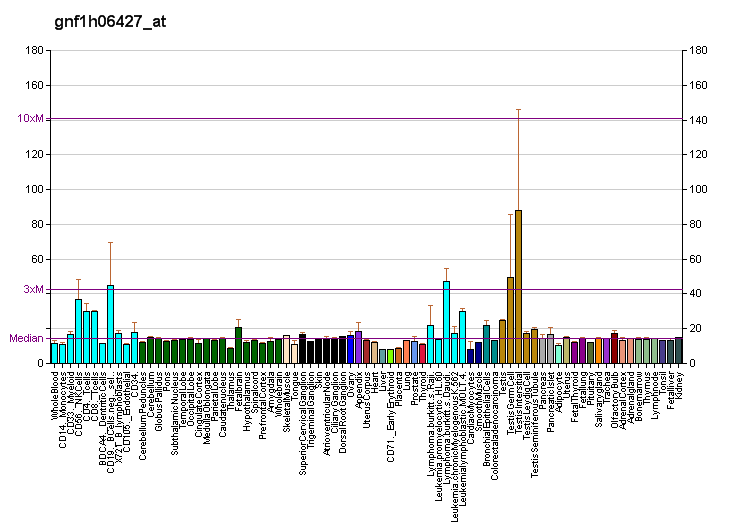
RNA expression pattern
Bgee	Human / Mouse (ortholog); Top expressed in: sperm; left testis; right testis; gonad; body of pancreas; skin of abdomen; skin of leg; mucosa of transverse colon; body of stomach; rectum / Top expressed in: left lobe of liver; spermatocyte; embryo; embryo; primary oocyte; secondary oocyte; right kidney; zygote; tail of embryo; seminiferous tubule; More reference expression data
BioGPS	More reference expression data
Gene ontology
Molecular function	iron ion binding; metal ion binding; monooxygenase activity; heme binding; oxidoreductase activity, acting on paired donors, with incorporation or reduction of molecular oxygen; oxidoreductase activity; vitamin D3 25-hydroxylase activity; steroid hydroxylase activity; oxidoreductase activity, acting on paired donors, with incorporation or reduction of molecular oxygen, reduced flavin or flavoprotein as one donor, and incorporation of one atom of oxygen
Cellular component	organelle membrane; endoplasmic reticulum membrane; intracellular membrane-bounded organelle; membrane; endoplasmic reticulum; cytoplasm
Biological process	response to ionizing radiation; vitamin D metabolic process; response to metal ion; vitamin metabolic process; calcitriol biosynthetic process from calciol; response to cesium ion; organic acid metabolic process; xenobiotic metabolic process; vitamin D biosynthetic process
Sources:Amigo / QuickGO
Orthologs
Databases	NCBI: entry; OMA: entry
Species	Human	Mouse
Entrez	120227	244209
Ensembl	ENSG00000186104	ENSMUSG00000030670
UniProt	Q6VVX0	Q6VVW9
RefSeq (mRNA)	NM_024514; NM_001377214; NM_001377215; NM_001377216; NM_001377217 NM_001377227	NM_177382
RefSeq (protein)	NP_078790; NP_001364143; NP_001364144; NP_001364145; NP_001364146 NP_001364156	NP_796356
Location (UCSC)	Chr 11: 14.88 – 14.89 Mb	Chr 7: 114.15 – 114.16 Mb
PubMed search
- Wikidata
View/Edit Human	View/Edit Mouse

CYP2R1 is cytochrome P450 2R1, an enzyme which is the principal vitamin D 25-hydroxylase. In humans it is encoded by the CYP2R1 gene located on chromosome 11p15.2. It is expressed in the endoplasmic reticulum in liver, where it performs the first step in the activation of vitamin D by catalyzing the formation of 25-hydroxyvitamin D.

Vitamin D 25-hydroxylase activity is also possessed by some other cytochrome P450 enzymes, in particular CYP27A1, which is found in mitochondria.

== Function ==
CYP2R1 is a member of the cytochrome P450 superfamily of enzymes. The cytochrome P450 proteins are mono-oxygenases which catalyze many reactions involved in drug metabolism and synthesis of cholesterol, steroids and other lipids.

CYP2R1 is present in the endoplasmic reticulum of the liver (the microsomal fraction). It has 25-hydroxylase activity, which converts cholecalciferol (vitamin D_{3}) into calcifediol (25-hydroxyvitamin D_{3}, also known as calcidiol), the major circulatory form of the vitamin.

cholecalciferol
CYP2R1
O_{2}
H_{2}O
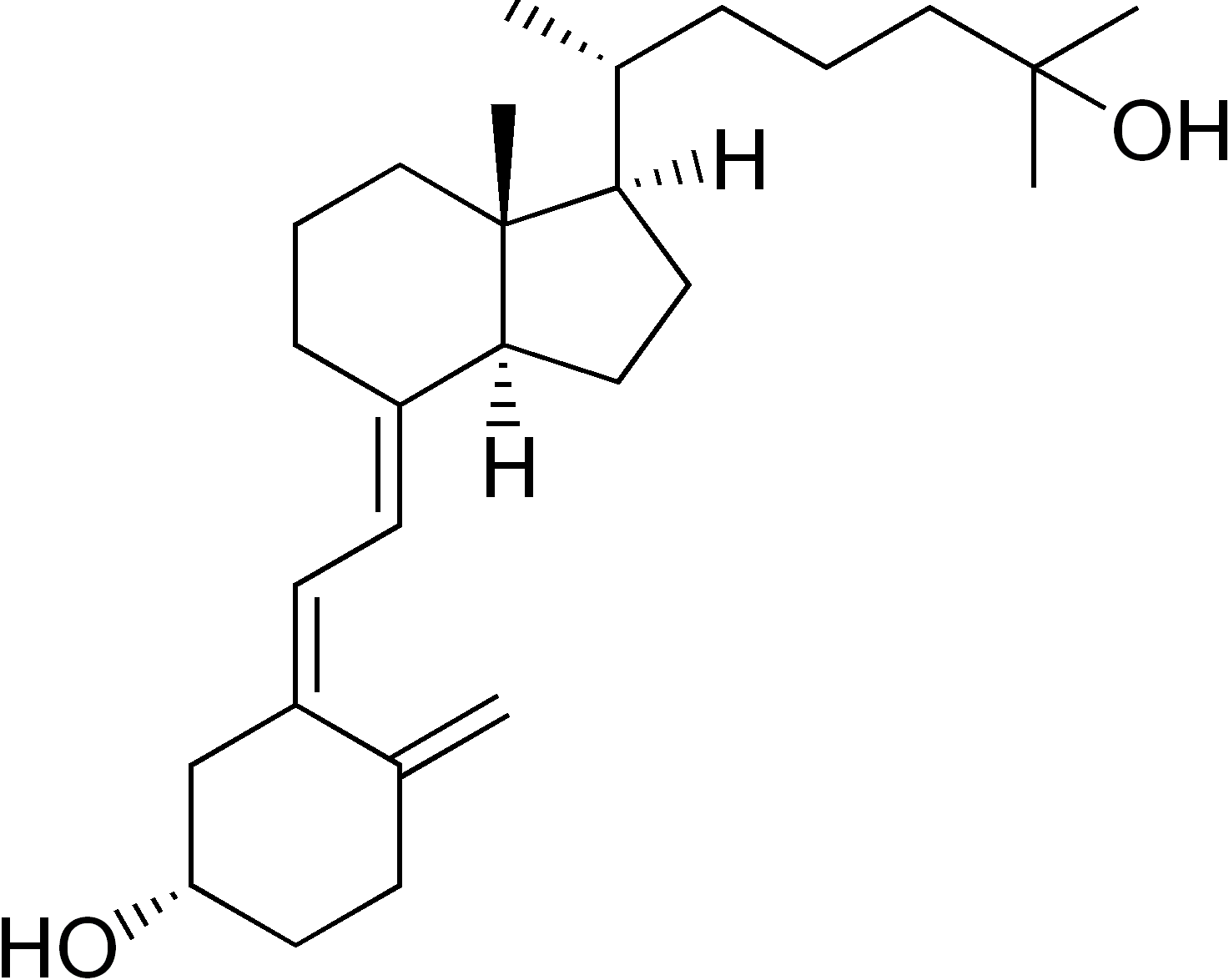
calcifediol

CYP2R1 will also hydroxylate ergocalciferol (vitamin D_{2}), derived from dietary sources, into 25-hydroxyvitamin D_{2} (ercalcidiol). These 25-hydroxylated forms of vitamin D, together known as 25(OH)D, bind strongly to the vitamin D-binding protein in blood and are the principal circulating forms of vitamin D. These are commonly measured to determine a person's vitamin D status and establish vitamin D deficiency.

Calcifediol is subsequently converted by the action of 25-hydroxyvitamin D3 1-alpha-hydroxylase to calcitriol, the active form of vitamin D_{3} which binds to the vitamin D receptor (VDR) and mediates most of the physiological hormonal actions of vitamin D.

== Clinical significance ==
The conversion of vitamin D, especially cholecalciferol, to 25(OH)D (calcifediol) is one of the key steps in the vitamin D hormonal system. The CYP2R1 enzymatic activity achieving this process was previously thought to be constitutively expressed and stable, so that serum 25(OH)D was a measure of the supply of vitamin D.

CYP2R1 is now known to be regulated, with variations in the expression and activity of CYP2R1 affecting circulating 25(OH)D. Low levels of CYP2R1 activity have been found after 24 hour fasting, in obesity, type 1 and type 2 diabetes and are decreased by glucocorticoids such as dexamethasone. These conditions are known to be linked to low blood levels of 25(OH)D, where even large doses of vitamin D may not produce an improvement, which can be explained by enzyme activities being low.

=== Polymorphic variations in CYP2R1 ===
Polymorphic variations in the CYP2R1 gene have the greatest effect on individual serum 25(OH)D concentrations compared with other gene variations. An inherited mutation in the CYP2R1 gene L99P, which results in the substitution of a proline for a leucine residue at codon 99, eliminates the enzyme activity and is associated with vitamin D-dependent rickets type IB. Another variant is K242N, where lysine at position 242 is substituted by asparagine, give a similar phenotype. Symptoms are low circulating levels of 25(OH)D and classic symptoms of vitamin D deficiency.

== Interactive pathway map ==
Click on genes, proteins and metabolites below to link to respective articles. (Note: The interactive pathway map can be edited at WikiPathways: "VitaminDSynthesis_WP1531".)

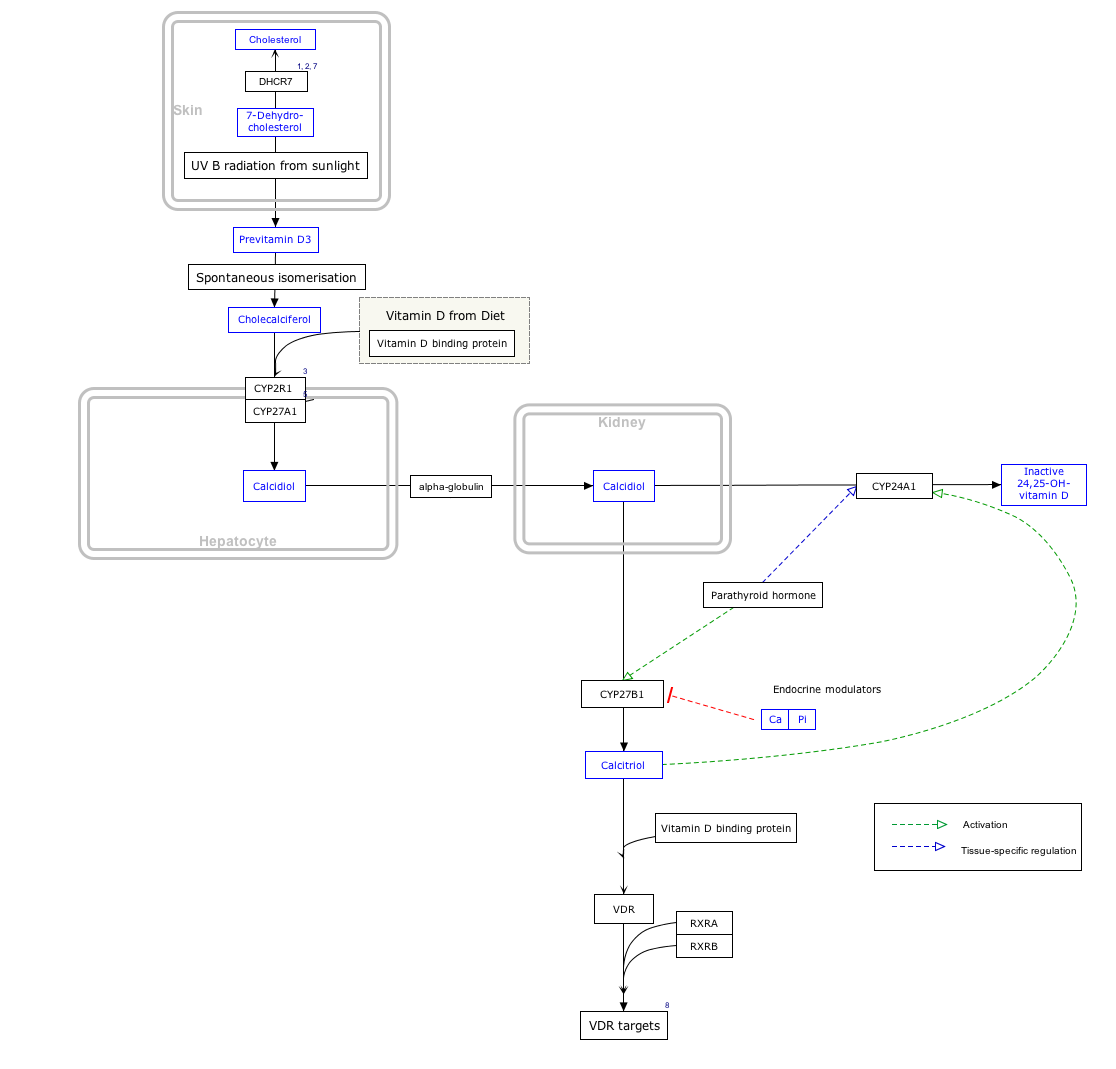

Vitamin D Synthesis Pathway (view / edit)

== Studies in mice ==
Model organisms have been used in the study of CYP2R1 function. Mice have been generated with knockout of Cyp2r1 and both Cyp2r1 and Cyp27a1. A conditional knockout mouse line called Cyp2r1^{tm1b(EUCOMM)Wtsi} has been generated and animals have undergone a standardized phenotypic screen.
