= Vitamin D deficiency in Australia =

Health condition

Vitamin D deficiency in Australia has been estimated as afflicting nearly one-quarter of all adults.

== Background ==
=== Importance of vitamin D ===
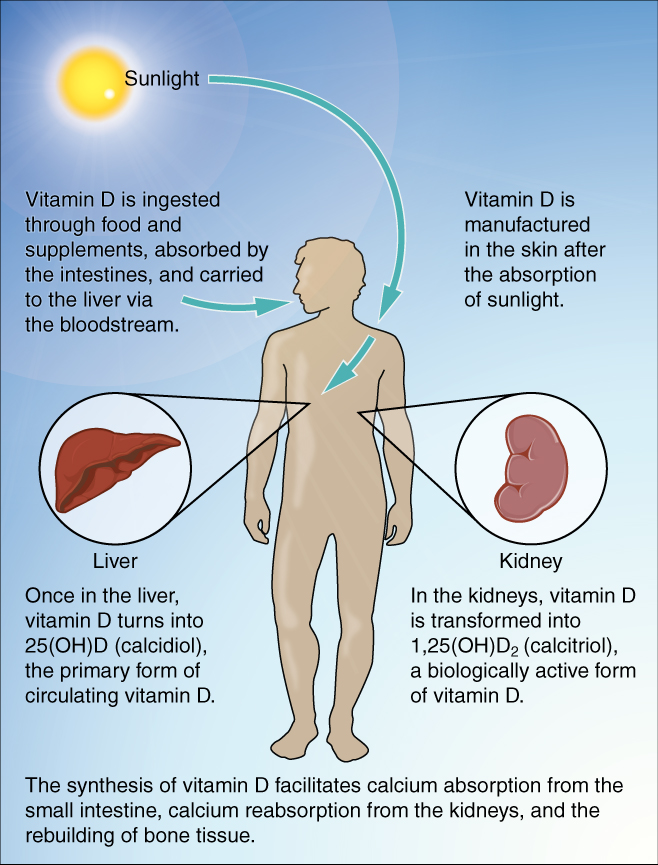
Synthesis of Vitamin D

Vitamin D plays an important role in which it supports calcium absorption in the body, sustaining good bone health as well as muscle function. When calcium in the body becomes under provided for normal bodily functions, calcitriol, an active form of Vitamin D, pairs with parathyroid hormone. Together they act to assemble cells in order to increase the calcium stores taken from bone. Additionally, if you consume vitamin D through your diet, or make vitamin D in your skin from UVB exposure, it is processed through two organs before it becomes activated. Vitamin D is first processed in the liver, before heading to the kidneys where it becomes activated to the form 1-25 dihydroxy vitamin D or alternatively named chemical calcitriol.

=== Vitamin D deficiency ===
Vitamin D deficiency historically used to be identified through counting cases of rickets. The old theory was that if someone had enough vitamin D to prevent rickets and osteomalacia, two skeletal disorders, they were considered safe from a deficiency. Nowadays through technological advancements Vitamin D deficiencies are now identified and thus calculated through the measurement of the serum 25-OH. According to the Australian Bureau of Statistics National Health Measures Survey (NHMS), the recommend Vitamin D levels to determine deficiency are categorised as follows:

- Adequate levels: > 50 nmol/L
- Mild deficiency: 30–49 nmol/L
- Moderate deficiency: 13–29 nmol/L
- Severe deficiency: < 13 nmol/L

In 1997, the prevalence of deficiency, defined as <17.5 nmol/L, was 2.8%, and the prevalence of insufficiency, defined as <37.5 nmol/L, was 27.6% among Australians over the age of 15. In 2011–2012, 23% of adults had a deficiency defined as below 49 nmol/L.

== Health effects ==
The health impacts commonly caused by deficiency of Vitamin D are rickets in children and osteoporosis in the elderly populations.

=== Rickets ===
Rickets can be traced back to the 1600s, where a pandemic arose with children around the globe from Vitamin D deficiency. The inadequate intake of UV exposure consequently lead children to numerous health problems such as, growth retardation, muscle weakness, skeletal deformities, hypocalcemia, tetany and seizures. During the late 19th century autopsies conducted in the Netherlands concluded that 80–90% of children were suffering from Rickets. The incidents of rickets observed within Sydney hospitals during the years of 2003–2004 have doubled. This major spike can be attributed to the growing population of migrants in Australia, many of whom are considered at high risk of vitamin D deficiency.

=== Osteoporosis ===
Because of the high prevalence of vitamin D deficiency alongside the ageing of Australia's population, conditions such as osteoporosis have become widespread among Australians over 60. Osteoporosis can be defined as very fragile and brittle bones, in which serious fractures can occur with just the slightest bump or fall. Osteoporosis Australia have predicted that half of all women and one third of men over the age of 60 years will suffer the debilitating effects of osteoporosis.

== High-risk groups ==
=== Age ===
Several studies conducted in Australia have revealed a deficiency ranging from 15 to 52% amongst the senior population. These deficiencies have been found to be higher amongst those who are home bound or living within institutions with less access to sun exposure. Vitamin D concentration levels below 28 nmol/L are common amongst the studies conducted. Throughout Sydney nursing home studies, it has been revealed that 86% of woman and 68% of men are falling into the moderate deficiency range.

In a study based in Western Australia, 63% of patients admitted with hip fractures were observed to have serum levels less than 50 nmol/L compared to 25% in the control group.

=== Skin colour and cultural reasons to avoid sunlight ===
In Australia, vitamin D deficiency has been recognised within particular subgroups such as aged, dark skinned of all ages, and veiled women. Dark skin has high levels of melanin pigmentation which decreases the cutaneous production of vitamin D. Compared with those of European descent, African-Americans require six times more UVB dosage to stimulate the same production of vitamin D in the skin.

=== Sun exposure ===
Despite Australia having a sunny climate, Australians are falling short of adequate levels of ultraviolet B (UVB) light from the sun. Associated factors contributing to the low vitamin D levels are seasonal variations such as winter, when there is minimal sunlight, less time spent outdoors, and people cover up due to cold weather. Environmental factors that impact vitamin D production are the elevation of the sun above the horizon and amount of cloud cover.

To ensure adequate vitamin D levels are reached, an average daily exposure, roughly 10% of the sunburn threshold is required on a significant area of skin, not just on the back of the hands. A burn time for a fair-skinned person could be limited to just 8 minutes in the middle of the day, during summer without sunscreens. A dark skinned person may need 45 minutes, while a covered individual might need several hours to achieve that same required exposure. The strength of the UVB changes throughout the day, so exposure time will need to change accordingly.

=== Obesity ===
There is conflicting evidence to suggest whether obesity contributes to vitamin D deficiency. Obese individuals have an increased risk of being vitamin D deficient likely caused by lack of sun exposure from reduced mobility and or low levels of physical activity. The serum levels of obese Australian were 8.3- 9.5 nmol/L lower in both genders comparable to those of healthy weight ranges. During the AusDiab study conducted throughout Australia serum levels within obese people were shown to be 57% lower than with normal weight after receiving the same amount of UV exposure.

=== Pregnancy ===
Pregnancy also poses as another high risk factor for vitamin D deficiency. The status levels of vitamin D during the last stages of pregnancy directly impact the newborns first initial months of life. Babies who are exclusively breastfed with minimal exposure to sunlight or supplementation can be at greater risk of vitamin D deficiency, as human milk often has minimal vitamin D present. Recommendations for infants of the age 0–12 months are set at 5 ug/day, to assist in preventing rickets in young babies. 80% of dark skinned and or veiled women in Melbourne were found to have serum levels lower than 22.5 nmol/L considering them to be within moderate ranges of vitamin D deficiency.

== Contributing factors ==
Australia's vitamin D deficiency levels in recent years have been on the increase, due to factors such as the long-term success of SunSmart government campaigns like Slip, Slop, Slap as well as Cancer Council Australia that have increased the general public's awareness of the risks associated with excessive sun exposure and skin cancers. The 'sun smart' campaign created in 1988 had a significant impact on the public approach and behaviours towards sun exposure. The success of this campaign reduced the sunburn rate by 50%, which researchers believe to have contributed to the rise in vitamin D deficiencies across Australia.

In addition to the reduced sun exposure amongst the Australia populations, there have been decreases in the form of dietary intake as many people are no longer taking fatty fish oil tablets as a method of regulating vitamin D.

Other factors previously mentioned are sun exposure, geographical longitude as well as season change. Greater latitudes receive sunlight that is of lesser ultra radiation strength in contrast to regions close to the equator, who receive lower variation to hours of daylight during the summer periods.

== Government strategies ==
=== Mandatory fortification ===
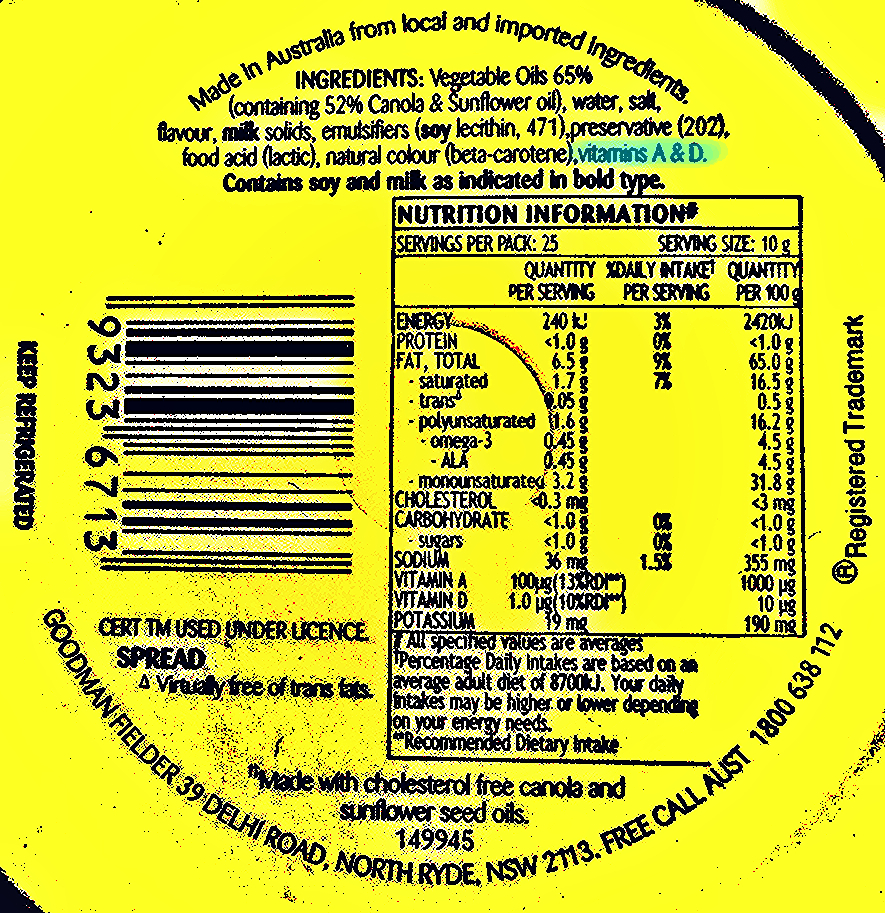
Vitamin D fortification in table spreads

In light of the increase of vitamin D deficiency throughout Australia the federal government introduced mandatory fortification of vitamins and minerals such as vitamin D in certain foods like edible oil spreads as indicated in the: Australian Standard 2.4.2. It is mandatory for all food manufacturing companies producing table spreads like spreadable butter and margarine to have no less than 55 mg/kg of vitamin D, as a response to a growing public health requirements.

In response to recent advances, public policies are being reconsidered to ensure vitamin D is evidently being measured. With the vitamin D deficiency resurfacing the nutrient reference value guidelines were established, in turn creating the dietary vitamin D recommendations.

The dietary vitamin D guidelines are assuming limited exposure to UVB sunlight are:

Infants, Children and Adults < 50 years: 5 μg/day (200 IU/day)

Adults > 50 - < 70 years: 10 μg/day (400 IU/day)

Adults > 70 years: 15 μg/day (600 IU/day)

== See also ==
- Vitamin D deficiency
- Vitamin D
- Sun exposure
