= Vitamin D toxicity =

Human disease

- Cholecalciferol (shown above) and ergocalciferol are the two major forms of vitamin D.
- Specialty: Endocrinology, toxicology

Vitamin D toxicity, or hypervitaminosis D, is the toxic state of an excess of vitamin D. The normal range for blood concentration of 25-hydroxyvitamin D in adults is 20 to 50 nanograms per milliliter (ng/mL). Blood levels necessary to cause adverse effects in adults are thought to be greater than about 150 ng/mL, leading the Endocrine Society to suggest an upper limit for safety of 100 ng/mL.

== Signs and symptoms ==
An excess of vitamin D causes abnormally high blood concentrations of calcium, which can cause overcalcification of soft tissues, including arteries and kidneys. Symptoms appear several months after excessive doses of vitamin D are administered. A mutation of the CYP24A1 gene can lead to a reduction in the degradation of vitamin D and thus to vitamin toxicity without high oral intake (see Vitamin D § Excess). Symptoms of vitamin D toxicity may include the following:

- Dehydration
- Vomiting
- Diarrhea
- Decreased appetite
- Irritability
- Constipation
- Fatigue
- Muscle weakness
- Insomnia

=== Treatment ===
In almost every case, ceasing vitamin D intake, combined with a low-calcium diet and corticosteroid drugs, will allow for a full recovery within a month. Bisphosphonate drugs (which inhibit bone resorption) can also be administered.

== Recommended supplement limits ==
The U.S National Academy of Medicine has established a Tolerable Upper Intake Level (UL) to protect against vitamin D toxicity ("The UL is not intended as a target intake; rather, the risk for harm begins to increase once intakes surpass this level."). These levels in microgram (mcg or μg) and International Units (IU) for both males and females, by age, are:
(Conversion : 1 μg = 40 IU and 0.025 μg = 1 IU.)

- 0–6 months: 25 μg/d (1000 IU/d)
- 7–12 months: 38 μg/d (1500 IU/d)
- 1–3 years: 63 μg/d (2500 IU/d)
- 4–8 years: 75 μg/d (3000 IU/d)
- 9+ years: 100 μg/d (4000 IU/d)
- Pregnant and lactating: 100 μg/d (4000 IU/d)

The recommended dietary allowance is 15 μg/d (600 IU per day; 800 IU for those over 70 years). Overdose has been observed at 1,925 μg/d (77,000 IU per day). Acute overdose requires between 15,000 μg/d (600,000 IU per day) and 42,000 μg/d (1,680,000 IU per day) over several days to months.

=== Suggested tolerable upper intake level ===
Based on risk assessment, a safe upper intake level of 250 μg (10,000 IU) per day in healthy adults has been suggested by non-government authors. Blood levels of 25-hydroxyvitamin D necessary to cause adverse effects in adults are thought to be greater than about 150 ng/mL, leading the Endocrine Society to suggest an upper limit for safety of 100 ng/mL.

== Long-term effects of supplementary oral intake ==
Excessive exposure to sunlight poses no risk of vitamin D toxicity through overproduction of vitamin D precursor, cholecalciferol, regulating vitamin D production. During ultraviolet exposure, the concentration of vitamin D precursors produced in the skin reaches an equilibrium, and any further vitamin D that is produced is degraded. This process is less efficient with increased melanin pigmentation in the skin. Endogenous production with full body exposure to sunlight is comparable to taking an oral dose between 250 μg and 625 μg (10,000 IU and 25,000 IU) per day.

Vitamin D oral supplementation and skin synthesis have a different effect on the transport form of vitamin D, plasma calcifediol concentrations. Endogenously synthesized vitamin D_{3} travels mainly with vitamin D-binding protein (DBP), which slows hepatic delivery of vitamin D and its availability in the plasma. In contrast, orally administered vitamin D produces rapid hepatic delivery of vitamin D and increases plasma calcifediol.

It has been questioned whether to ascribe a state of suboptimal vitamin D status when the annual variation in ultraviolet will naturally produce a period of falling levels, and such a seasonal decline has been a part of Europeans' adaptive environment for 1000 generations. Still more contentious is recommending supplementation when those supposedly in need of it are labeled healthy and serious doubts exist as to the long-term effect of attaining and maintaining serum 25(OH)D of at least 80 nmol/L by supplementation.

Current theories of the mechanism behind vitamin D toxicity (starting at a plasmatic concentration of ≈750 nmol/L) propose that:

- Intake of vitamin D raises calcitriol concentrations in the plasma and cell
- Intake of vitamin D raises plasma calcifediol concentrations, which exceed the binding capacity of the DBP, and free calcifediol enters the cell
- Intake of vitamin D raises the concentration of vitamin D metabolites, which exceed DBP binding capacity, and free calcitriol enters the cell

All of these affect gene transcription and overwhelm the vitamin D signal transduction process, leading to vitamin D toxicity.

=== Cardiovascular disease ===
Evidence suggests that dietary vitamin D may be carried by lipoprotein particles into cells of the artery wall and atherosclerotic plaque, where it may be converted to active form by monocyte-macrophages. This raises questions regarding the effects of vitamin D intake on atherosclerotic calcification and cardiovascular risk as it may be causing vascular calcification. Calcifediol is implicated in the etiology of atherosclerosis, especially in people of color.

The levels of the active form of vitamin D, calcitriol, are inversely correlated with coronary calcification. Moreover, the active vitamin D analog, alfacalcidol, seems to protect patients from developing vascular calcification. Serum vitamin D has been found to correlate with calcified atherosclerotic plaque in African Americans as they have higher active serum vitamin D levels compared to Euro-Americans. Higher levels of calcidiol positively correlate with aorta and carotid calcified atherosclerotic plaque in African Americans but not with coronary plaque, whereas individuals of European descent have an opposite, negative association. There are racial differences in the association of coronary calcified plaque in that there is less calcified atherosclerotic plaque in the coronary arteries of African-Americans than in European-Americans.

Among descent groups with heavy sun exposure during their evolution, taking supplemental vitamin D to attain the 25(OH)D level associated with optimal health in studies done with mainly European populations may have deleterious outcomes. Despite abundant sunshine in India, vitamin D status in Indians is low and suggests a public health need to fortify Indian foods with vitamin D. However, the levels found in India are consistent with many other studies of tropical populations which have found that even an extreme amount of sun exposure, does not raise 25(OH)D levels to the levels typically found in Europeans.

Recommendations stemming from a single standard for optimal serum 25(OH)D concentrations ignore the differing genetically mediated determinants of serum 25(OH)D and may result in ethnic minorities in Western countries having the results of studies done with subjects not representative of ethnic diversity applied to them. Vitamin D levels vary for genetically mediated reasons as well as environmental ones.

=== Ethnic differences ===
Possible ethnic differences in physiological pathways for ingested vitamin D, such as the Inuit, may confound across-the-board recommendations for vitamin D levels. Inuit compensate for lower production of vitamin D by converting more of this vitamin to its most active form.

Studies on the South Asian population uniformly point to low 25(OH)D levels, despite abundant sunshine. Rural men around Delhi average 44 nmol/L. Healthy Indians seem to have low 25(OH)D levels, which are not very different from healthy South Asians living in Canada. Measuring melanin content to assess skin pigmentation showed an inverse relationship with serum 25(OH)D. The uniform occurrence of very low serum 25(OH)D in Indians living in India and Chinese in China does not support the hypothesis that the low levels seen in the more pigmented are due to lack of synthesis from the sun at higher latitudes.

== Comparative Toxicity: Use of Vitamin D in Rodenticides ==
Vitamin D compounds, specifically cholecalciferol (D3) and ergocalciferol (D2), are used in rodenticides due to their ability to induce hypercalcemia, a condition characterized by elevated calcium levels in the blood. This overdose leads to organ failure and is pharmacologically similar to vitamin D's toxic effects in humans.

Concentrations used in these rodenticides are several orders of magnitude higher than the maximum recommended human intake, with acute baits containing 3,000,000 IU/g for D3 and 4,000,000 IU/g for D2. This leads to hypercalcemia in the rodents and subsequent death several days after ingestion.

== See also ==
- Hypervitaminosis
- Vitamin D and neurology
- Vitamin D deficiency
