= Vitamin D deficiency =

Human disorder

- Other names: Hypovitaminosis D
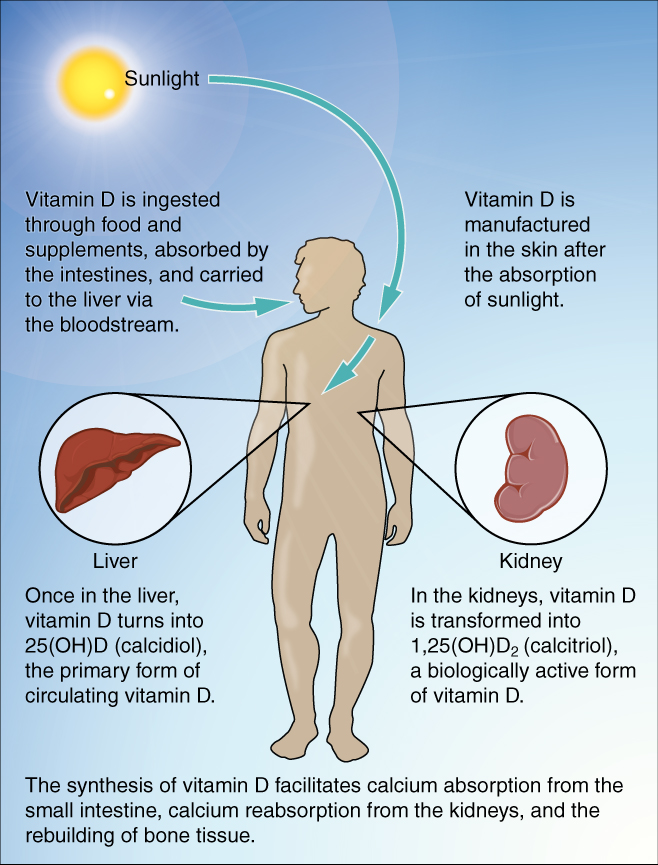
- The normal process of Vitamin D absorption
- Specialty: Endocrinology
- Symptoms: Usually asymptomatic
- Complications: Rickets, osteomalacia, other associated disorders
- Causes: Lack of vitamin D, inadequate sunlight exposure
- Risk factors: Age, people with dark skin, obesity, malabsorption, bariatric surgery, breastfed infants
- Diagnostic method: Measuring the concentration of calcifediol in the blood
- Prevention: Sufficient sunlight exposure, dietary intake
- Treatment: Supplements
- Medication: Cholecalciferol, ergocalciferol, calcifediol
- Frequency: Severe deficiency (<30 nmol/L): Europe 13%, US 5.9%, Canada 7.4%. Deficiency (<50 nmol/L): Europe 40%, US 24%, Canada 37%

Vitamin D deficiency or hypovitaminosis D is a vitamin D level that is below normal. It most commonly occurs in people when they have inadequate exposure to sunlight, particularly sunlight with adequate ultraviolet B rays. Vitamin D deficiency can also be caused by inadequate nutritional intake of vitamin D; disorders that limit vitamin D absorption; and disorders that impair the conversion of vitamin D to active metabolites, including certain liver, kidney, and hereditary disorders. Deficiency impairs bone mineralization, leading to bone-softening diseases, such as rickets in children. It can also worsen osteomalacia and osteoporosis in adults, increasing the risk of bone fractures. Muscle weakness is also a common symptom of vitamin D deficiency, further increasing the risk of falls and bone fractures in adults.

Vitamin D can be synthesized in the skin under exposure to UVB from sunlight. Oily fish, such as salmon, herring, and mackerel, are also sources of vitamin D, as are mushrooms. Milk is often fortified with vitamin D; sometimes bread, juices, and other dairy products are fortified with vitamin D. Many multivitamins contain vitamin D in different amounts.

== Classifications ==
Mapping of several bone diseases onto levels of vitamin D (calcidiol) in the blood

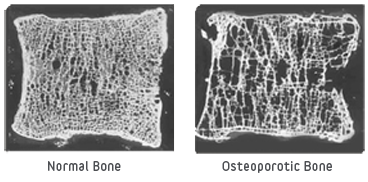
Normal bone vs. osteoporosis

Vitamin D deficiency is typically diagnosed by measuring the concentration of the 25-hydroxyvitamin D in the blood, which is the most accurate measure of stores of vitamin D in the body. One nanogram per millilitre (1 ng/mL) is equivalent to 2.5 nanomoles per litre (2.5 nmol/L).

The National Institutes of Health cautions that "serum concentrations of 25(OH)D that are associated with vitamin D deficiency have not been definitively identified", but endorses the following guidelines:

NIH Classification	ng/mL	nmol/L
Deficient	<12 ng/mL	<30 nmol/L
Inadequate	12–20 ng/mL	30–50 nmol/L
Adequate	≥20 ng/mL	≥50 nmol/L
Potentially Excessive	>50 ng/mL	>125 nmol/L

Some researchers characterize <12 ng/mL (or <30 nmol/L) as severe deficiency, stating that it "dramatically increases the risk of excess mortality, infections, and many other diseases".

Vitamin D levels falling within the adequate range prevent clinical manifestations of vitamin D insufficiency as well as vitamin D toxicity.

The Endocrine Society previously characterized 20 ng/mL - 29 ng/mL as "insufficiency", but updated its guidelines in 2024.

== Signs and symptoms ==
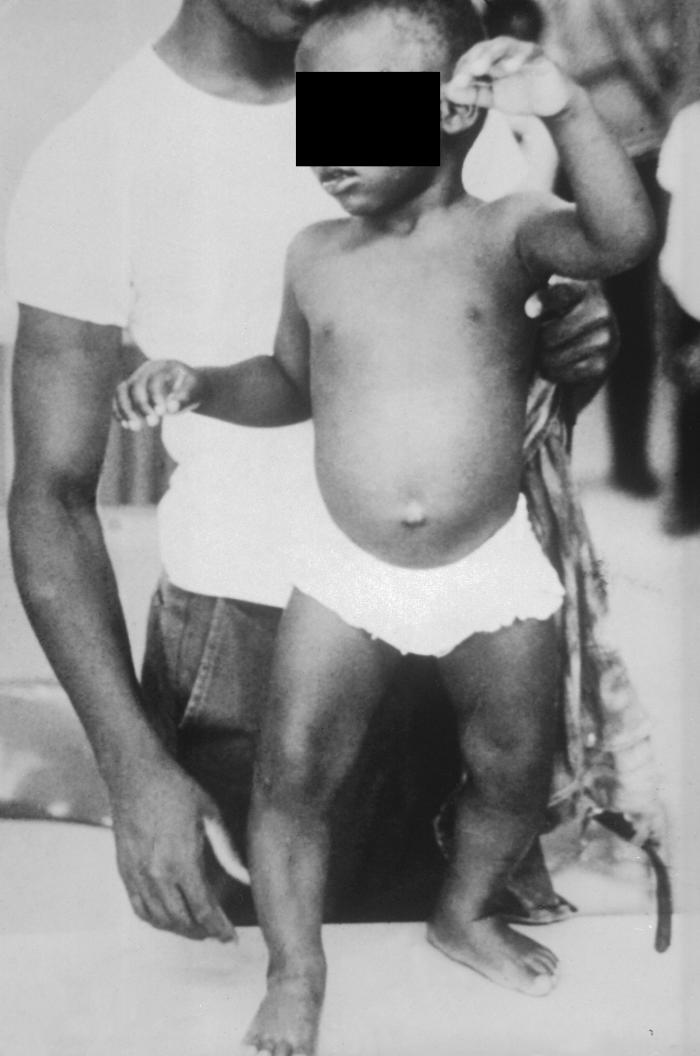
Child with rickets

Most affected people with vitamin D deficiency may not have any symptoms. The most commonly reported symptoms are muscle weakness, the other can be muscle pain or spasms, lethargy, increased risk of fracture. Severe vitamin D deficiency in children may result in rickets, a disease characterized by impeded growth and deformity of the long bones. The earliest sign of vitamin D deficiency is craniotabes, abnormal softening or thinning of the skull. In adults and adolescents, it may lead to osteomalacia, a bone-thinning disorder and is characterized by proximal muscle weakness and bone fragility. To date, investigators have nominally linked several other health conditions to vitamin D deficiency, including, depression and anxiety, respiratory infections and COVID-19, pre-eclampsia, insomnia, and even the development of schizophrenia. These studies may have insufficient evidence to conclude that the vitamin had any effect on a long list of potential health outcomes.

== Risk factors ==
Those most likely to be affected by vitamin D deficiency are people with little exposure to sunlight. Certain climates, dress habits, the avoidance of sun exposure, and the excessive use of sunscreen protection can limit production of vitamin D in the skin.

=== Age ===
Elderly people have a higher risk of having a vitamin D deficiency due to a combination of several risk factors, including decreased sunlight exposure, decreased intake of vitamin D in the diet, and decreased skin thickness, which leads to further decreased absorption of vitamin D from sunlight.

=== Fat percentage ===
Since vitamin D_{3} (cholecalciferol) and vitamin D_{2} (ergocalciferol) are fat-soluble, humans and other animals with a skeleton need to store some fat. Without fat, the animal will have a hard time absorbing vitamin D_{2} and vitamin D_{3}, and the lower the fat percentage, the greater the risk of vitamin deficiency, which is the case in some athletes who strive to get as lean as possible.

=== Malnutrition ===
Although rickets and osteomalacia are now rare in Britain, osteomalacia outbreaks in some immigrant communities included women with seemingly adequate daylight outdoor exposure wearing typical Western clothing. Having darker skin and reduced exposure to sunshine did not produce rickets unless the diet deviated from a Western omnivore pattern characterized by high intakes of meat, fish, and eggs and low intakes of high-extraction cereals. In sunny countries where rickets occurs among older toddlers and children, rickets has been attributed to low dietary calcium intakes. This is characteristic of cereal-based diets with limited access to dairy products. Rickets was formerly a major public health problem among the US population; in Denver, almost two-thirds of 500 children had mild rickets in the late 1920s. An increase in the proportion of animal protein in the 20th-century American diet coupled with increased consumption of milk fortified with relatively small quantities of vitamin D coincided with a dramatic decline in the number of rickets cases. One study of children in a hospital in Uganda, however, showed no significant difference in vitamin D levels of malnourished children compared to non-malnourished children. Because both groups were at risk due to darker skin pigmentation, both groups had vitamin D deficiency. Nutritional status did not appear to play a role in this study.

=== Obesity ===
There is an increased risk of vitamin D deficiency in people who are considered overweight or obese based on their body mass index (BMI) measurement. The relationship between these conditions is not well understood. Different factors could contribute to this relationship, particularly diet, and sunlight exposure. Alternatively, vitamin D is fat-soluble, so excess amounts can be stored in fat tissue and used during winter when sun exposure is limited.

=== Sun exposure ===
The use of sunscreen with a sun protection factor of 8 can theoretically inhibit more than 95% of vitamin D production in the skin. In practice, however, sunscreen is applied so as to have a negligible effect on vitamin D status. Vitamin D sufficiency of those in Australia and New Zealand is unlikely to have been affected by campaigns advocating sunscreen. Instead, wearing clothing is more effective at reducing the amount of skin exposed to UVB and reducing natural vitamin D synthesis. Clothing that covers a large portion of the skin, when worn on a consistent and regular basis, such as the burqa, is correlated with lower vitamin D levels and an increased prevalence of vitamin D deficiency.

Regions far from the equator have a high seasonal variation of the amount and intensity of sunlight. In the UK, the prevalence of low vitamin D status in children and adolescents is found to be higher in winter than in summer. Lifestyle factors such as indoor versus outdoor work and time spent in outdoor recreation play an important role.

Additionally, vitamin D deficiency has been associated with urbanisation in terms of both air pollution, which blocks UV light, and an increase in the number of people working indoors. The elderly are generally exposed to less UV light due to hospitalisation, immobility, institutionalisation, and being housebound, leading to decreased levels of vitamin D.

=== Darker skin color ===
Because of melanin which enables natural sun protection, dark-skinned people are susceptible to vitamin D deficiency. Three to five times greater sun exposure is necessary for naturally darker skinned people to produce the same amount of vitamin D as those with light skin.

=== Malabsorption ===
Rates of vitamin D deficiency are higher among people with untreated celiac disease, inflammatory bowel disease, exocrine pancreatic insufficiency from cystic fibrosis, and short bowel syndrome, which can all produce problems of malabsorption. Vitamin D deficiency is also more common after surgical procedures that reduce absorption from the intestine, including weight loss procedures.

=== Critical illness ===
Vitamin D deficiency is associated with increased mortality in critical illness. People who take vitamin D supplements before being admitted for intensive care are less likely to die than those who do not take vitamin D supplements. Additionally, vitamin D levels decline during stays in intensive care. Vitamin D_{3} (cholecalciferol) or calcitriol given orally may reduce the mortality rate without significant adverse effects.

=== Breastfeeding ===
Infants who exclusively breastfeed need a vitamin D supplement, especially if they have dark skin or have minimal sun exposure. The American Academy of Pediatrics recommends that all breastfed infants receive 400 international units (IU) per day of oral vitamin D.

== Pathophysiology ==
Decreased exposure of the skin to sunlight is a common cause of vitamin D deficiency. People with a darker skin pigment with increased amounts of melanin may have decreased production of vitamin D. Melanin absorbs ultraviolet B radiation from the sun and reduces vitamin D production. Sunscreen can also reduce vitamin D production. Medications may speed up the metabolism of vitamin D, causing a deficiency.

The liver is required to transform vitamin D into 25-hydroxyvitamin D. This is an inactive metabolite of vitamin D but is a necessary precursor (building block) to create the active form of vitamin D.

The kidneys are responsible for converting 25-hydroxyvitamin D to 1,25-hydroxyvitamin D. This is the active form of vitamin D in the body. Kidney disease reduces 1,25-hydroxyvitamin D formation, leading to a deficiency of the effects of vitamin D.

Intestinal conditions that result in malabsorption of nutrients may also contribute to vitamin D deficiency by decreasing the amount of vitamin D absorbed via diet. In addition, a vitamin D deficiency may lead to decreased absorption of calcium by the intestines, resulting in increased production of osteoclasts that may break down a person's bone matrix. In states of hypocalcemia, calcium will leave the bones and may give rise to secondary hyperparathyroidism, which is a response by the body to increase serum calcium levels. The body does this by increasing the uptake of calcium by the kidneys and continuing to take calcium away from the bones. If prolonged, this may lead to osteoporosis in adults and rickets in children.

== Diagnosis ==
The serum concentration of calcifediol, also called 25-hydroxyvitamin D (abbreviated 25(OH)D), is typically used to determine vitamin D status. Most vitamin D is converted to 25(OH)D in the serum, giving an accurate picture of vitamin D status. The level of serum 1,25(OH)D (calcitriol) is not usually used to determine vitamin D status because it often is regulated by other hormones in the body such as parathyroid hormone. The levels of 1,25(OH)D can remain normal even when a person may be vitamin D deficient. Serum level of 25(OH)D is the laboratory test ordered to indicate whether or not a person has vitamin D deficiency or insufficiency. It is also considered reasonable to treat at-risk persons with vitamin D supplementation without checking the level of 25(OH)D in the serum, as vitamin D toxicity has only been rarely reported to occur.

Levels of vitamin D above the Tolerable Upper Intake Level of 25 to 100 micrograms (1,000–4,000 IU, depending on age) can cause high blood calcium levels, which may impair kidney function and produce cardiac arrhythmias. Toxicity from vitamin D results from excessive supplement intake.

== Screening ==
The official recommendation from the United States Preventive Services Task Force is that for persons that do not fall within an at-risk population and are asymptomatic, there is not enough evidence to prove that there is any benefit in screening for vitamin D deficiency.

== Treatment ==
=== UVB exposure ===
Vitamin D overdose is impossible from UV exposure: the skin reaches an equilibrium where the vitamin degrades as fast as it is created.

==== Light therapy ====
Exposure to photons (light) at specific wavelengths of narrowband UVB enables the body to produce vitamin D to treat vitamin D deficiency.

=== Supplement ===
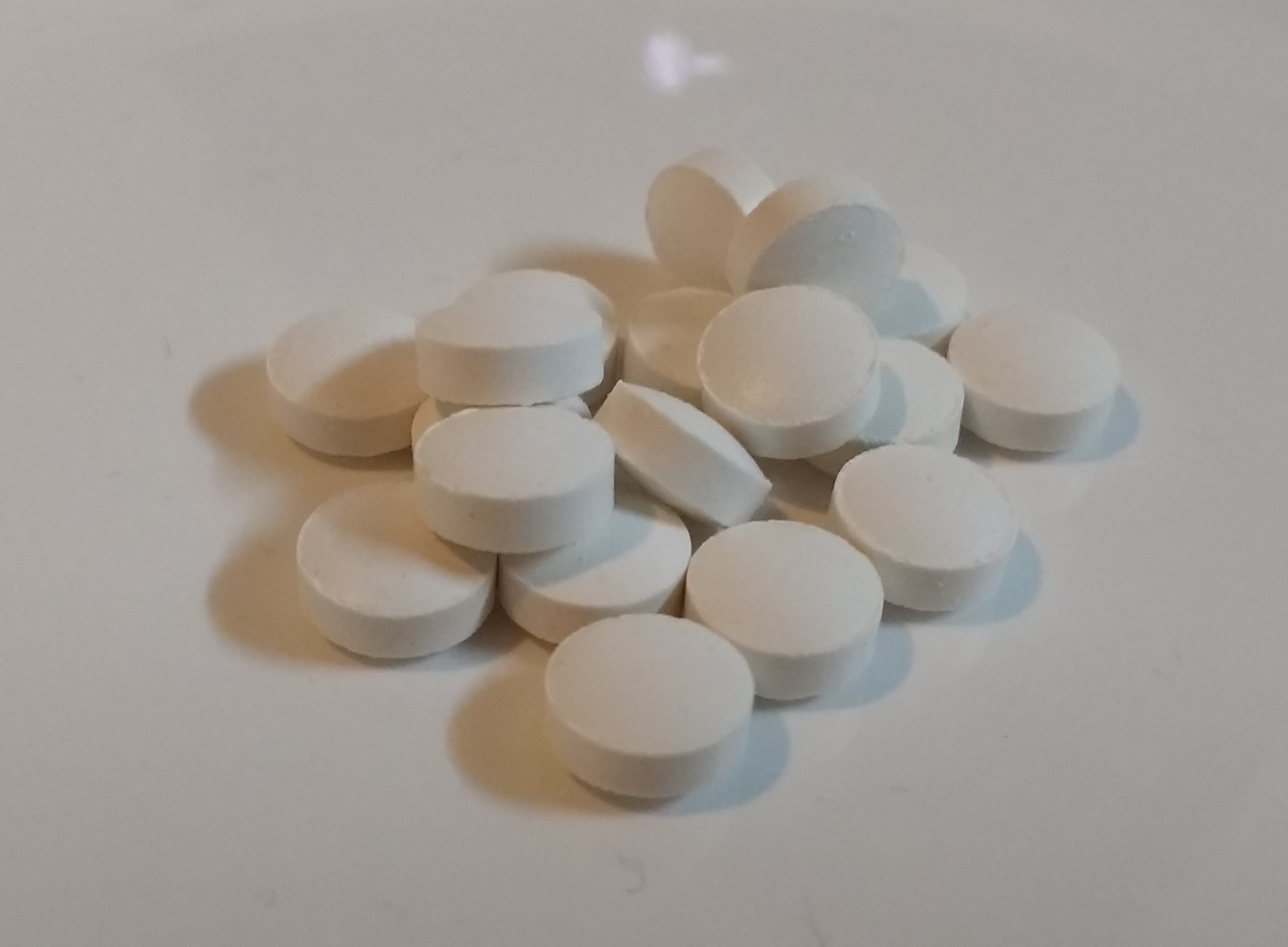
Vitamin D_{2} supplements

In the United States, the Food and Nutrition Board at the National Academies of Sciences, Engineering, and Medicine has established Recommended Dietary Allowances and Adequate Intakes for vitamin D. These values range from 15 to 20 μg (600–800 IU) for adults and from 10 to 15 μg (400–600 IU) for infants, children, and adolescents, depending on age. The Canadian Paediatric Society recommends that pregnant or breastfeeding women consider taking 2000 IU/day, that all babies who are exclusively breastfed receive a supplement of 400 IU/d, and that babies living north of 55°N get 800 IU/d from October to April.

Treating vitamin D deficiency depends on the severity of the deficit. Treatment involves an initial high-dosage treatment phase until the required serum levels are reached, followed by the maintenance of the acquired levels. The lower the 25(OH)D serum concentration is before treatment, the higher the dosage that is needed to quickly reach an acceptable serum level.

The initial high-dosage treatment can be given on a daily or weekly basis or can be given in form of one or several single doses (also known as stoss therapy, from the German word Stoß, meaning "push").

Therapy prescriptions vary, and there is no consensus yet on how best to arrive at an optimum serum level. While there is evidence that vitamin D_{3} raises 25(OH)D blood levels more effectively than vitamin D_{2}, other evidence indicates that D_{2} and D_{3} are equal for maintaining 25(OH)D status.

==== Initial phase ====
===== Daily, weekly, or monthly dose =====
For treating rickets, the American Academy of Pediatrics (AAP) has recommended that pediatric patients receive an initial two to three months of treatment with "high-dose" vitamin D therapy. In this regime, the daily dose of cholecalciferol is 1000 IU for newborns, 1000 to 5000 IU for 1- to 12-month-old infants, and 5000 IU for patients over 1 year of age.

For adults, other dosages have been called for. A review of 2008/2009 recommended dosages of 1000 IU cholecalciferol per 10 ng/mL required serum increase, to be given daily over two to three months. In another proposed cholecalciferol loading dose guideline for vitamin D-deficient adults, a weekly dosage is given, up to a total amount that is proportional to the required serum increase (up to the level of 75 nmol/L) and within certain bodyweight limits, to body weight.

According to new data and practices relevant to vitamin D levels in the general population in France, to establish optimal vitamin D status and frequency of intermittent supplement dosing, patients with or at high risk for osteoporosis and vitamin D deficiency should start supplementation with a loading phase consisting of 50000 IU weekly of vitamin D for eight weeks in patients with levels <20 ng/mL and 50000 IU weekly for four weeks in patients with levels between 20 and 30 ng/mL. Subsequently, long-term supplementation should be prescribed as 50000 IU monthly. Should pharmaceutical forms suitable for daily supplementation become available, patients displaying good treatment adherence could take a daily dose determined based on the 25(OH)D level.

There are no consistent data suggesting the ideal regimen of supplementation with vitamin D, and the question of the ideal time between doses is still of debate. Ish-Shalom et al. performed a study in elderly women to compare the efficacy and safety of a daily dose of 1500 IU to a weekly dose of 10500 IU and to a dose of 45000 IU given every 28 days for two months. They concluded that supplementation with vitamin D can be equally achieved with daily, weekly, or monthly dosing frequencies. Another study comparing daily, weekly, and monthly supplementation of vitamin D in deficient patients was published by Takacs et al. They reported equal efficacy of 1000 IU taken daily, 7000 IU taken weekly, and 30000 IU taken monthly. Nevertheless, these consistent findings differ from the report by Chel et al., in which a daily dose was more effective than a monthly dose. In that study, the compliance calculation could be questionable since only random samples of the returned medications were counted. In a study by De Niet et al., 60 subjects with vitamin D deficiency were randomized to receive 2000 IU vitamin D3 daily or 50000 IU monthly. They reported a similar efficacy of the two dosing frequencies, with the monthly dose providing more rapid normalization of vitamin D levels.

===== Single-dose therapy =====
Alternatively, a single-dose therapy is used for instance if there are concerns regarding the patient's compliance. The single-dose therapy can be given as an injection but is normally given in the form of oral medication.

===== Vitamin D doses and meals =====
The presence of a meal and the fat content of that meal may also be important. Because vitamin D is fat-soluble, it is hypothesized that absorption would be improved if patients are instructed to take their supplement with a meal. Raimundo et al. performed different studies confirming that a high-fat meal increased the absorption of vitamin D3 as measured by serum 25(OH) D. A clinical report indicated that serum 25(OH) D levels increased by an average of 57% over a 2-month to 3-month period in 17 clinic patients after they were instructed to take their usual dose of vitamin D with the largest meal of the day.

Another study conducted in 152 healthy men and women concluded that diets rich in monounsaturated fatty acids may improve and those rich in polyunsaturated fatty acids may reduce the effectiveness of vitamin D3 supplements. In another study performed by Cavalier E. et al., 88 subjects received orally a single dose of 50000 IU of vitamin D3 solubilized in an oily solution as two ampoules each containing 25000 IU (D‐CURE®, Laboratories SMB SA, Brussels, Belgium) with or without a standardized high‐fat breakfast. No significant difference between fasting vs. fed conditions was observed.

==== Maintenance phase ====
Once the desired serum level has been achieved, be it by a high daily or weekly or monthly dose or by a single-dose therapy, the AAP recommendation calls for a maintenance supplementation of 400 IU for all age groups, with this dosage being doubled for premature infants, dark-skinned infants and children, children who reside in areas of limited sun exposure (>37.5° latitude), obese patients, and those on certain medications.

==== Special cases ====
To maintain blood levels of calcium, therapeutic vitamin D doses are sometimes administered (up to 100000 IU or 2.5 mg daily) to patients who have had their parathyroid glands removed (most commonly kidney dialysis patients who have had tertiary hyperparathyroidism, but also to patients with primary hyperparathyroidism) or with hypoparathyroidism. Patients with chronic liver disease or intestinal malabsorption disorders may also require larger doses of vitamin D (up to 40000 IU, or 1 mg, daily).

==== Co-supplementation with vitamin K ====
The combination of vitamin D and vitamin K supplements has been shown in trials to improve bone quality. As high intake of vitamin D is a cause of raised calcium levels (hypercalcemia), the addition of vitamin K may be beneficial in helping to prevent vascular calcification, particularly in people with chronic kidney disease.

== Epidemiology ==
The estimated percentage of the population with a vitamin D deficiency varies based on the threshold used to define a deficiency.

Percentage of US population	Definition of insufficiency	Study	Ref.
69.5%	25(OH)D less than 30 ng/mL	Chowdury et al. 2014	
77%	25(OH)D less than 30 ng/mL	Ginde et al. 2009	
36%	25(OH)D less than 20 ng/mL	Ginde et al. 2009	
6%	25(OH)D less than 10 ng/mL	Ginde et al. 2009	

Recommendations for 25(OH)D serum levels vary across authorities, and probably vary based on demographic factors like age; calculations for the epidemiology of vitamin D deficiency depend on the recommended level used.

A 2011 Institute of Medicine (IOM) report set the sufficiency level at 20 ng/mL (50 nmol/L), while in the same year The Endocrine Society defined sufficient serum levels at 30 ng/mL and others have set the level as high as 60 ng/mL. As of 2011 most reference labs used the 30 ng/mL standard.

Applying the IOM standard to NHANES data on serum levels, for the period from 1988 to 1994 22% of the US population was deficient, and 36% were deficient for the period between 2001 and 2004; applying the Endocrine Society standard, 55% of the US population was deficient between 1988 and 1994, and 77% were deficient for the period between 2001 and 2004.

In 2011 the Centers for Disease Control and Prevention applied the IOM standard to NHANES data on serum levels collected between 2001 and 2006 and determined that 32% of Americans were deficient during that period (8% at risk of deficiency, and 24% at risk of inadequacy).

== History ==
The role of diet in the development of rickets was determined by Edward Mellanby between 1918 and 1920. In 1921, Elmer McCollum identified an antirachitic substance found in certain fats that could prevent rickets. Because the newly discovered substance was the fourth vitamin identified, it was called vitamin D. The 1928 Nobel Prize in Chemistry was awarded to Adolf Windaus, who discovered the steroid 7-dehydrocholesterol, the precursor of vitamin D. Potential anticancer roles of the vitamin D metabolite calcifediol were observed epidemiologically by Frank Garland and Cedric Garland in the 1980s which were later observed clinically by Michael F. Holick and Raphael E. Cuomo.

Before the fortification of milk products with vitamin D, rickets was a major public health problem. In the United States, milk has been fortified with 10 micrograms (400 IU) of vitamin D per quart since the 1930s, leading to a dramatic decline in the number of rickets cases.

== Research ==
Some evidence suggests vitamin D deficiency may be associated with a worse outcome for some cancers, but evidence is insufficient to recommend that vitamin D be prescribed for people with cancer. Taking vitamin D supplements has no significant effect on cancer risk. Vitamin D_{3}, however, appears to decrease the risk of death from cancer but concerns with the quality of the data exist. Nevertheless, studies suggest that Vitamin D deficiency is associated with increased risk of development of melanoma. Low levels of 25-hydroxyvitamin D, a routinely used marker for vitamin D, have been suggested as a contributing factor in increasing the risk in the development and progression of various types of cancer. Vitamin D requires activation by cytochrome P450 (CYP) enzymes to become active and bind to the VDR. Specifically, CYP27A1, CYP27B1, and CYP2R1 are involved in the activation of vitamin D, while CYP24A1 and CYP3A4 are responsible for the degradation of the active vitamin D. CYP24A1, the primary catabolic enzyme of calcitriol, is overexpressed in melanoma tissues and cells. This overexpression could lead to lower levels of active vitamin D in tissues, potentially promoting the development and progression of melanoma. Several drug classes and natural health products can modulate vitamin D-related CYP enzymes, potentially causing lower levels of vitamin D and its active metabolites in tissues, suggesting that maintaining adequate vitamin D levels, that is, avoiding vitamin D deficiency, either through dietary supplements or by modulating CYP metabolism, could be beneficial in decreasing the risk of melanoma development.

Vitamin D deficiency is thought to play a role in the pathogenesis of metabolic dysfunction–associated steatotic liver disease.

Evidence suggests that vitamin D deficiency may be associated with impaired immune function.

Review studies have also seen associations between vitamin D deficiency and pre-eclampsia.

== See also ==
- Hypervitaminosis D
- Vitamin D deficiency in Australia
