= 25-Hydroxyvitamin D 1-alpha-hydroxylase =

Mammalian protein found in humans

CYP27B1

Identifiers
- Aliases: CYP27B1, CP2B, CYP1, CYP1alpha, CYP27B, P450c1, PDDR, VDD1, VDDR, VDDRI, VDR, cytochrome P450 family 27 subfamily B member 1
- External IDs: OMIM: 609506; MGI: 1098274; GeneCards: CYP27B1
Enzyme activity
| EC # | BRENDA | ExPASy | KEGG | MetaCyc |
|---|---|---|---|---|
| 1.14.15.18 | ↗ | ↗ | ↗ | ↗ |

Gene location (Human)
| Chr. | Chromosome 12 (human) |
| Band | 12q14.1 | Start | 57,762,334 bp |
| Band | 12q14.1 | End | 57,768,986 bp |

Gene location (Mouse)
| Chr. | Chromosome 10 (mouse) |
| Band | 10|10 D3 | Start | 126,884,119 bp |
| Band | 10|10 D3 | End | 126,888,875 bp |
RNA expression pattern
| Bgee | Human / Mouse (ortholog); Top expressed in: kidney tubule; metanephric glomerulus; body of pancreas; hair follicle; right lobe of thyroid gland; left lobe of thyroid gland; left adrenal gland; human kidney; left adrenal cortex; right adrenal gland / Top expressed in: morula; right kidney; embryo; convoluted tubule; embryo; proximal convoluted tubule; lip; human kidney; uterus; spermatocyte; More reference expression data |
| BioGPS | n/a |
Gene ontology
| Molecular function | iron ion binding; metal ion binding; monooxygenase activity; heme binding; oxidoreductase activity, acting on paired donors, with incorporation or reduction of molecular oxygen; oxidoreductase activity; calcidiol 1-monooxygenase activity |
| Cellular component | cytoplasm; membrane; mitochondrial membranes; mitochondrial outer membrane; mitochondrion |
| Biological process | bone mineralization; response to vitamin D; calcium ion homeostasis; response to interferon-gamma; vitamin D metabolic process; regulation of bone mineralization; positive regulation of keratinocyte differentiation; G1 to G0 transition; response to estrogen; response to lipopolysaccharide; negative regulation of calcidiol 1-monooxygenase activity; decidualization; vitamin metabolic process; negative regulation of cell growth; calcitriol biosynthetic process from calciol; positive regulation of vitamin D 24-hydroxylase activity; vitamin D catabolic process; positive regulation of vitamin D receptor signaling pathway; calcium ion transport; negative regulation of cell population proliferation |
Sources:Amigo / QuickGO
Orthologs
| Databases | NCBI: entry; OMA: entry |
| Species | Human | Mouse |
| Entrez | 1594 | 13115 |
| Ensembl | ENSG00000111012 | ENSMUSG00000006724 |
| UniProt | O15528 | O35084 |
| RefSeq (mRNA) | NM_000785 | NM_010009 |
| RefSeq (protein) | NP_000776 | NP_034139 |
| Location (UCSC) | Chr 12: 57.76 – 57.77 Mb | Chr 10: 126.88 – 126.89 Mb |
| PubMed search |
- Wikidata
| View/Edit Human | View/Edit Mouse |

calcidiol 1-monooxygenase

Identifiers
- EC no.: 1.14.15.18
- CAS no.: 9081-36-1

Databases
- BRENDA: enzyme data
- ExPASy: NiceZyme view
- KEGG: enzyme entry
- MetaCyc: metabolic pathway
- Rhea: reactions
- PDB structures: RCSB PDB PDBe PDBsum
- Gene Ontology: AmiGO / QuickGO
Search
- PMC: articles
- PubMed: articles
- NCBI: proteins

25-Hydroxyvitamin D 1-alpha-hydroxylase (VD 1A hydroxylase) also known as calcidiol 1-monooxygenase or cytochrome p450 27B1 (CYP27B1) or simply 1-alpha-hydroxylase is a cytochrome P450 enzyme that in humans is encoded by the CYP27B1 gene.

VD 1A hydroxylase is located in the proximal tubule of the kidney and a variety of other tissues, including skin (keratinocytes), immune cells, and bone (osteoblasts).

== Reactions ==
The enzyme catalyzes the hydroxylation of calcifediol to calcitriol (the bioactive form of Vitamin D):

calcidiol + 2 reduced adrenodoxin + 2 H^{+} + O_{2} ⇌ calcitriol + 2 oxidized adrenodoxin + H_{2}O

The enzyme is also able to oxidize ercalcidiol (25-OH D2) to ercalcitriol, secalciferol to calcitetrol, and 25-hydroxy-24-oxocalciol to (1S)-1,25-dihydroxy-24-oxocalciol.

Calcidiol

Calcitriol

== Clinical significance ==
Loss-of-function mutations in CYP27B1 cause Vitamin D-dependent rickets, type IA.

== Interactive pathway map ==
Click on genes, proteins and metabolites below to link to respective articles. (Note: The interactive pathway map can be edited at WikiPathways: "VitaminDSynthesis_WP1531".)

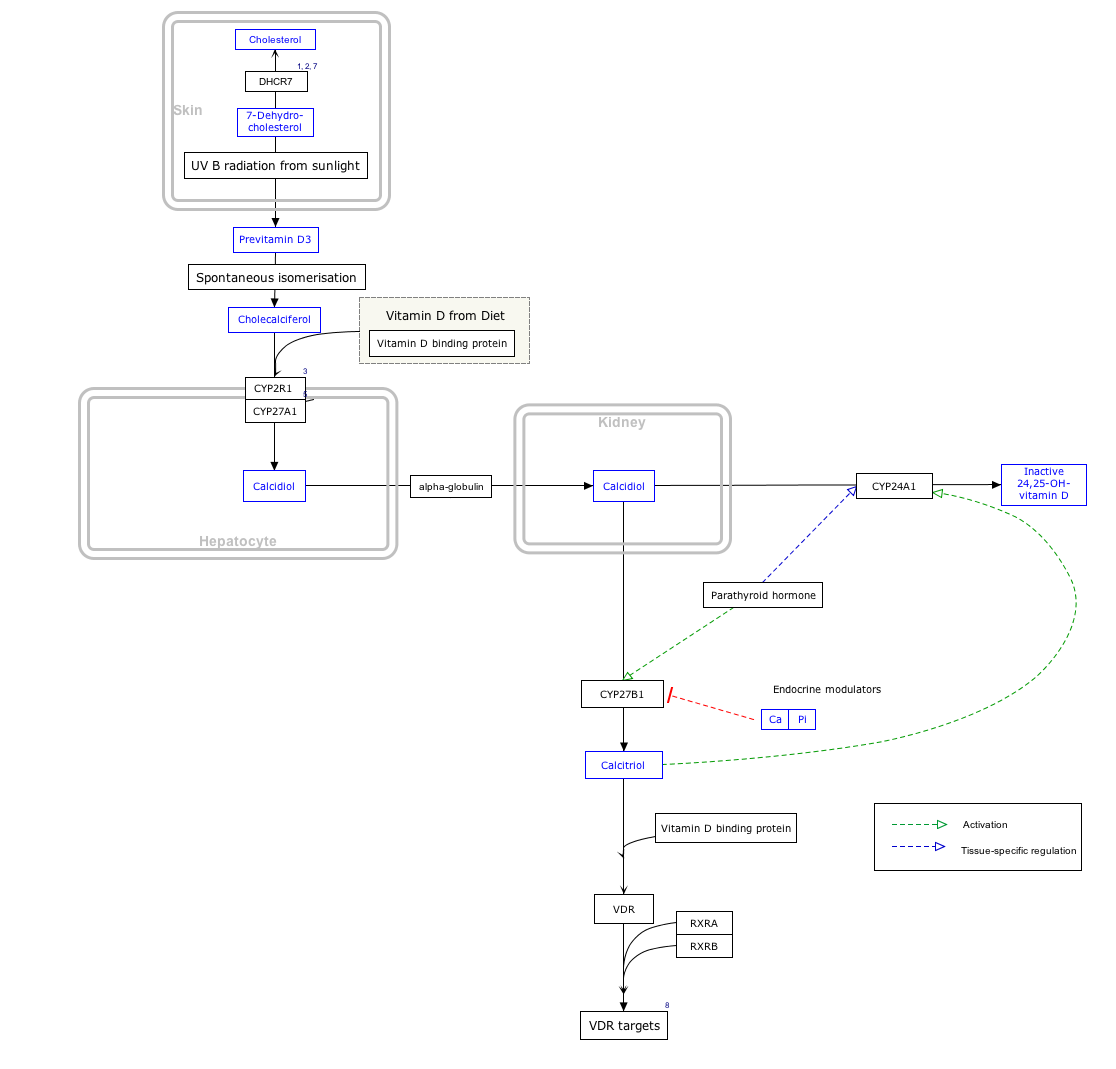

Vitamin D Synthesis Pathway (view / edit)
