= C-5 sterol desaturase =

Class of enzymes

C-5 sterol desaturase (also known as sterol C-5 desaturase and C5SD) is an enzyme that is highly conserved among eukaryotes and catalyzes the dehydrogenation of a C-5(6) bond in a sterol intermediate compound as a step in the biosynthesis of major sterols. The precise structure of the enzyme's substrate varies by species. For example, the human C-5 sterol desaturase (also known as lathosterol oxidase) oxidizes lathosterol, while its ortholog ERG3 in the yeast Saccharomyces cerevisiae oxidizes episterol.

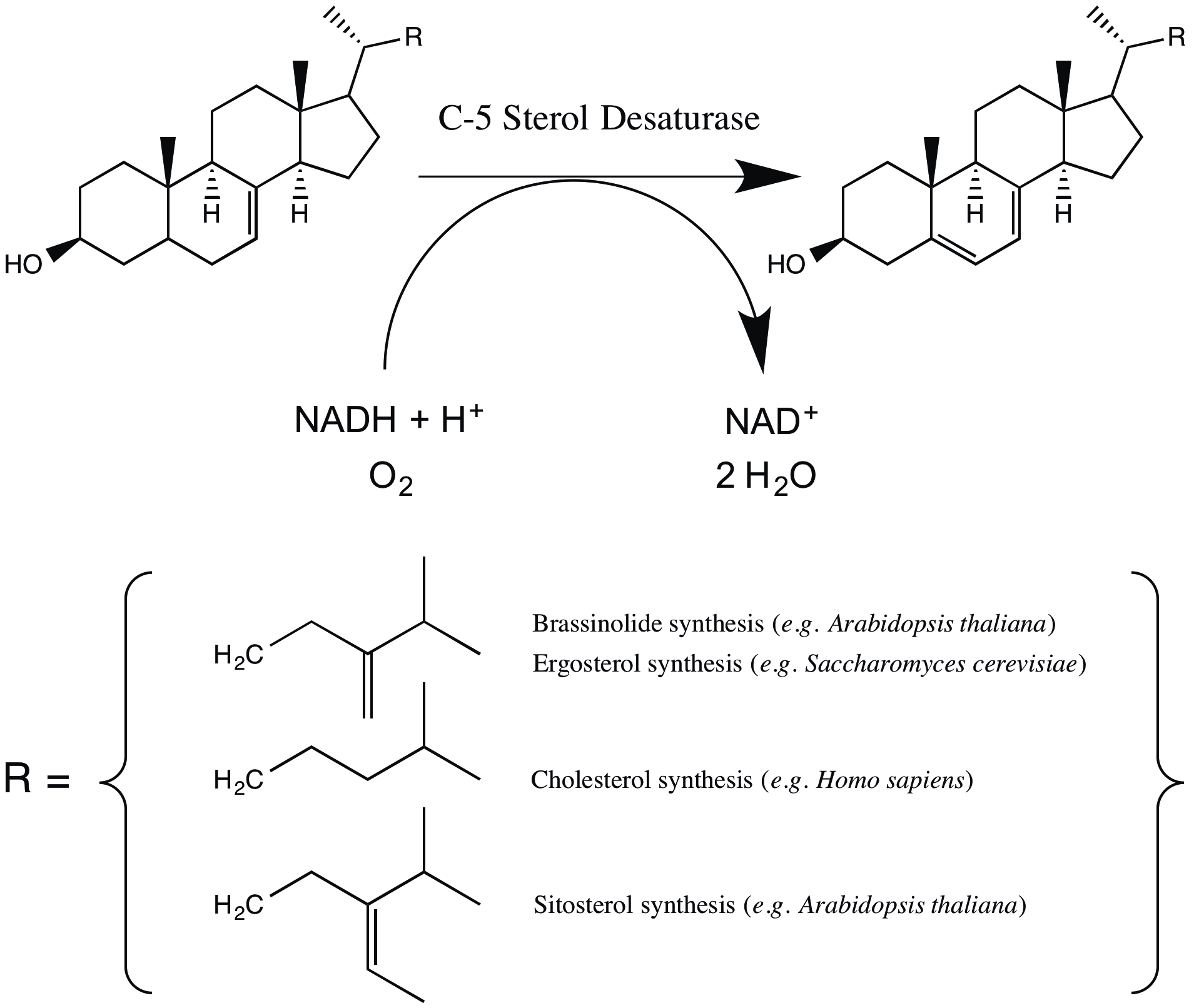
The precise structural details of C-5 sterol desaturase substrates vary across eukaryotes. Shown below the reaction scheme are three possible distal groups along with biosynthetic pathways and species they are found in.

== Mechanism ==
C-5 sterol desaturase couples sterol oxidation to the oxidation of NAD(P)H and the reduction of molecular oxygen. Either NADH or NADPH can be used; in the model plant species Arabidopsis thaliana C-5 sterol desaturase catalyzes the reaction twice as fast with NADH while in S. cerevisiae the enzyme has little preference. The precise details of the reaction have been thought to vary between mammals and yeast. However, the enzymes do share a conserved cluster of histidine residues, which when mutated (in A. thaliana) dramatically reduce or eliminate enzyme activity, suggesting the involvement of a coordinated iron cation in the mechanism. Mutagenesis studies suggest that in A. thaliana threonine 114 (which is a serine in humans, mice, and yeast) may help to stabilize the enzyme-substrate complex. Rahier has proposed a reaction mechanism in which an iron-coordinated oxygen abstracts a hydrogen from the substrate leading to a radical intermediate.

== Biological role ==
C-5 sterol desaturase catalyzes an intermediate step in the synthesis of major sterols. The particular biosynthetic pathway varies across eukaryotes. In animals C5SD catalyzes the dehydration of lathosterol to 7-dehydrocholesterol, a step in the synthesis of cholesterol. Cholesterol serves multiple roles in the cell including modulating membrane fluidity serving as a precursor to steroid hormones. In fungi C5SD catalyzes the dehydration of episterol as a step in the synthesis of ergosterol, a sterol that regulates cell membrane fluidity and permeability. In plants such as Arabidopsis thaliana, C-5 sterol desaturase catalyzes the dehydrogenation of episterol and avenasterol in a pathway thought to lead to a variety of membrane components as well as a class of hormones called brassinosteroids.

=== Subcellular localization ===
Based on its amino acid profile C-5 sterol desaturase appears to have four to five membrane-spanning regions, suggesting that it is a transmembrane protein. C5SD activity has been demonstrated in microsomes from rat tissue, implying that rat enzyme localizes to the endoplasmic reticulum Fluorescence microscopy experiments have shown that in the ciliate Tetrahymena thermophila C5SD localizes to the endoplasmic reticulum and that in S. cerevisiae C5SD localizes to both the endoplasmic reticulum and vesicles. In Arabidopsis thaliana C5SD is located in both the endoplasmic reticulum and lipid particles.

== Clinical Relevance ==
=== Antifungal resistance ===
The common class of antifungal drugs known as azoles disrupts the fungal sterol biosynthesis pathway, upstream of C-5 sterol desaturase leading to the accumulation of nontoxic 14α-methylated sterols. C5SD then converts these intermediates into a toxic product. Consequently, in both the pathogenic fungus Candida albicans and model organism S. cerevisiae mutations in the gene encoding C-5 sterol desaturase (ERG3) allow the cell to avoid synthesizing the toxic sterol products and have been shown to confer azole resistance. In at least the case of fluconazole, antifungal resistance due to C5SD inactivation is dependent on the activity of the chaperone protein Hsp90 and the phosphatase calcineurin. However, the clinical relevance of this azole resistance mechanism is controversial because while the deletion of ERG3 alone confers fluconazole resistance to C. albicans in vitro, it is insufficient to confer fluconazole resistance in a live mouse model.

=== Lathosterolosis ===
In at least one patient, a deficiency in C-5 sterol desaturase activity (termed lathosterolosis) was associated with multiple malformations, metal retardation, and liver disease. This patient was also found to have low levels of blood cholesterol and high levels of lathosterol in cell membranes when compared to those of healthy control subjects. These symptoms resemble those of other defects in cholesterol synthesis such as Smith–Lemli–Opitz syndrome.

== Potential applications ==
Scientists have found that tomato plants engineered with the C-5 sterol desaturase from the mushroom Flammulina velutipes show improved drought tolerance and fungal pathogen resistance as well as increased iron and polyunsaturated fat content. The authors of the study suggest that the fungal enzyme may be a useful tool for plant biotechnology as improving multiple aspects of a crop is typically time- and labor-intensive.
