= Δ7-sterol 5(6)-desaturase =

Enzyme

Δ^{7}-sterol 5(6)-desaturase

Identifiers
- EC no.: 1.14.19.20
- CAS no.: 37255-37-1

Databases
- BRENDA: enzyme data
- ExPASy: NiceZyme view
- KEGG: enzyme entry
- MetaCyc: metabolic pathway
- Rhea: reactions
- PDB structures: RCSB PDB PDBe PDBsum
Search
- PMC: articles
- PubMed: articles
- NCBI: proteins

In enzymology, a Δ^{7}-sterol 5(6)-desaturase (EC 1.14.19.20) is an enzyme that catalyzes the chemical reaction

Δ^{7}-sterol + 2 ferrocytochrome b_{5} + O_{2} + 2 H^{+} = Δ^{5,7}-sterol + 2 ferricytochrome b_{5} + 2 H_{2}O

== Function ==
This enzyme participates in biosynthesis of steroids; in vertebrates the pathway leads to cholesterol. The oxidation reaction which it catalyses is:

lathosterol
+ 2 Fe^{2+} + 2 H^{+}
O_{2}
2 H_{2}O
7-dehydrocholesterol
+ 2 Fe^{3+}

It uses two molecules of the cofactor ferrocytochrome b_{5} with two protons and one oxygen to convert lathosterol to 7-dehydrocholesterol and water. In plants it acts on episterol.

== Classification ==
This enzyme is one of C-5 sterol desaturases, belongs to the family of oxidoreductases, specifically those acting on paired donors, with O_{2} as oxidant and incorporation or reduction of oxygen. The oxygen incorporated need not be derived from O_{2}. With oxidation of a pair of donors resulting in the reduction of molecular oxygen to two molecules of water.

== Nomenclature ==
The systematic name of this enzyme class is Δ^{7}-sterol,ferrocytochrome b5:oxygen oxidoreductase 5,6-dehydrogenating. Other names in common use include:

- lathosterol oxidase
- Δ^{7}-sterol Δ^{5}-dehydrogenase
- Δ^{7}-sterol 5-desaturase
- Δ^{7}-sterol-C5(6)-desaturase
- 5-DES

Gene names:

- SC5D (vertebrates)
- ERG3 (yeast)

== See also ==
- Fatty acid desaturase
