= C27H42O =

The molecular formula C_{27}H_{42}O (molar mass: 382.62 g/mol) may refer to:

- 7-Dehydrodesmosterol
- Zymosterone
