= ERG3 =

Sterol C-5 desaturase

Identifiers
- Organism: Saccharomyces cerevisiae
- Symbol: ERG3
- Alt. symbols: SC5D, SYR1
- Entrez: 850745
- HomoloGene: 5044
- RefSeq (mRNA): NM_001181943

Other data
- EC number: 1.14.19.20
- Chromosome: XII: 0.25 - 0.25 Mb

ERG3 or sterol C-5 desaturase is a fungal enzyme originally from Saccharomyces cerevisiae, the human ortholog of ERG3 is SC5D. ERG3 localizes to both the endoplasmic reticulum and vesicles, catalyzes the C5(6)-dehydrogenation of episterol to 5-dehydroepisterol, 5-Dehydroepisterol will be further converted into ergosterol.

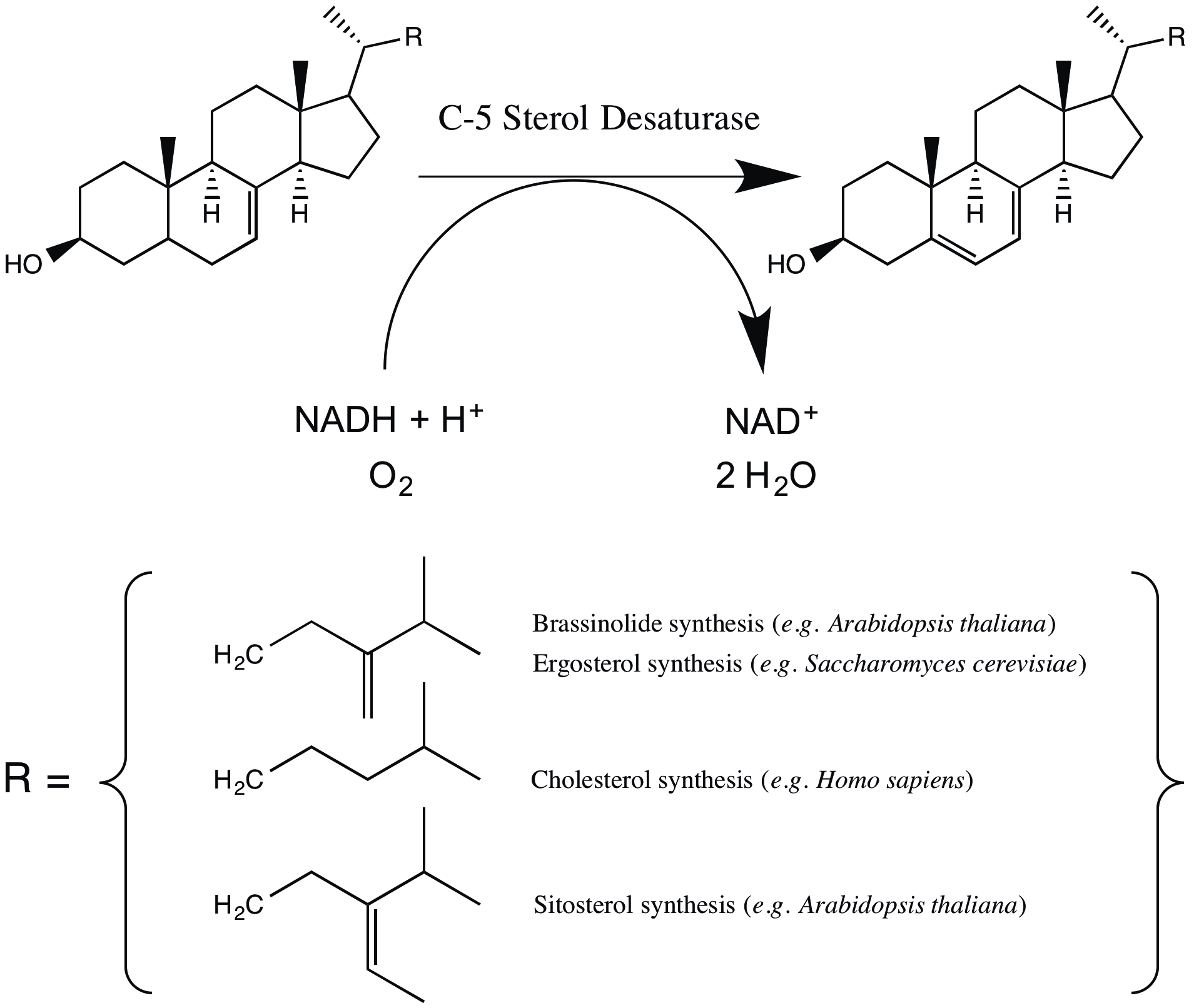
The precise structural details of C-5 sterol desaturase substrates vary across eukaryotes. Shown below the reaction scheme are three possible distal groups along with biosynthetic pathways and species they are found in.

== See also ==
- C-5 sterol desaturase
- Δ^{7}-sterol 5(6)-desaturase
