= 5-Dehydroepisterol =

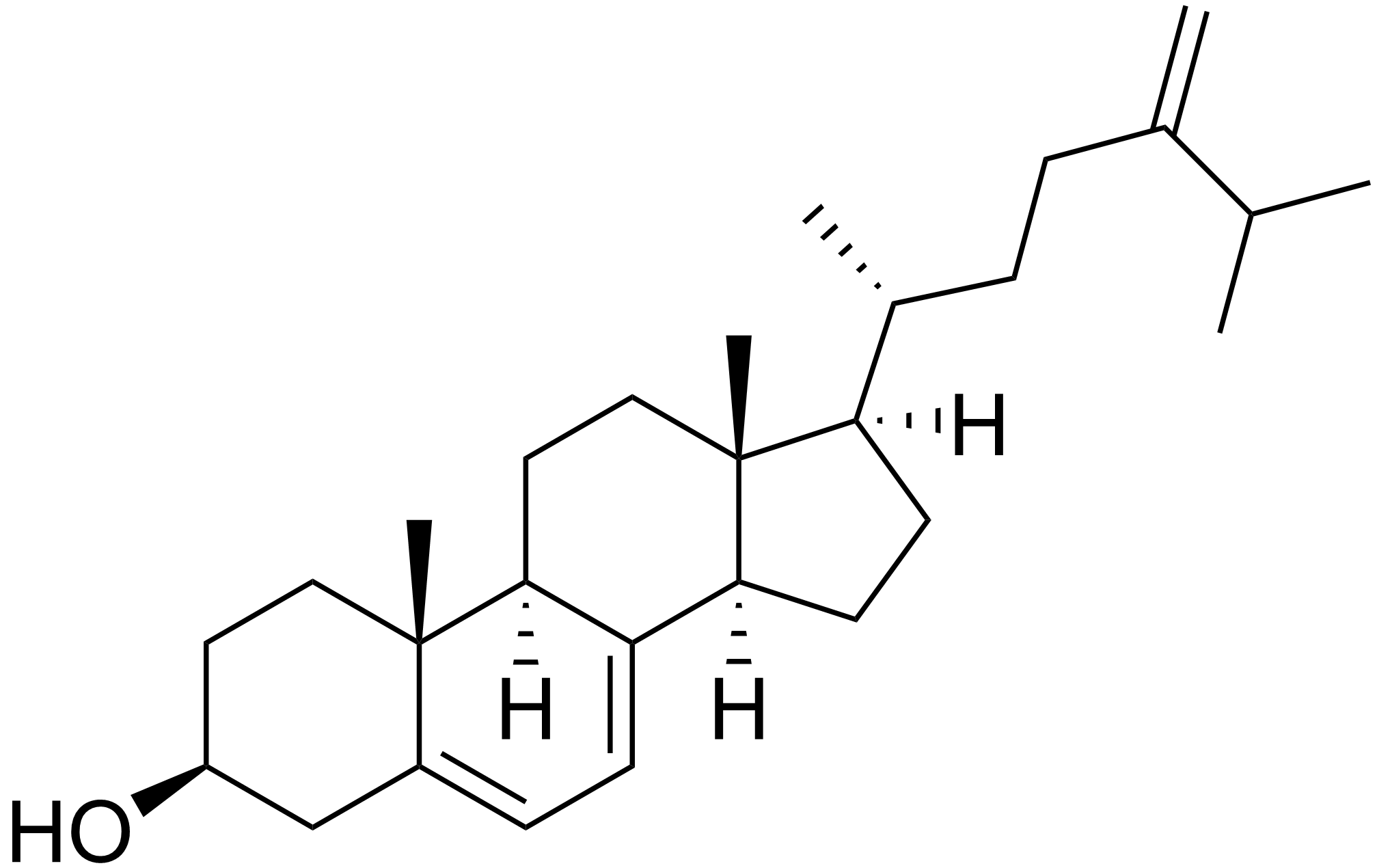

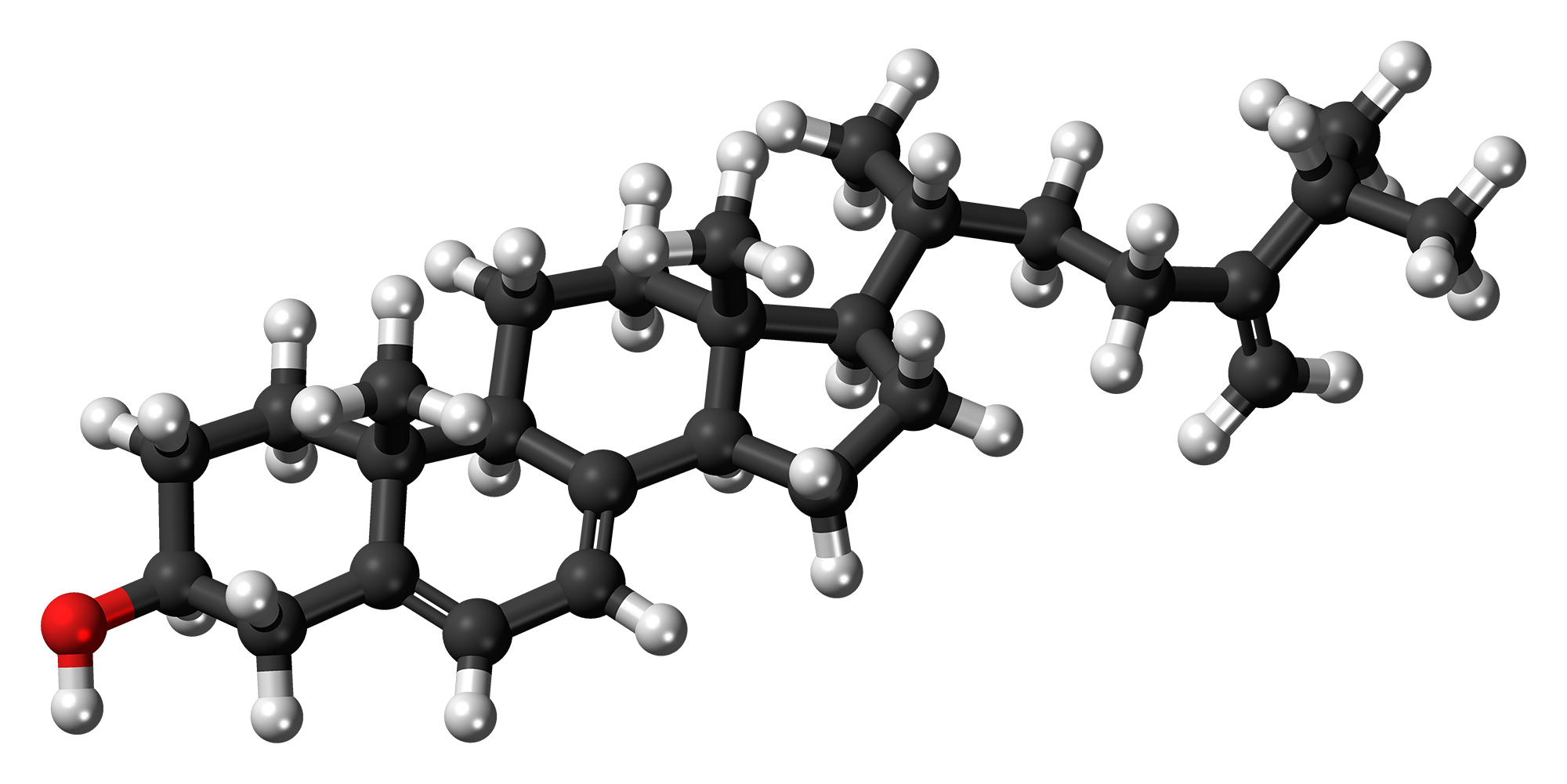

Names
- IUPAC name Campesta-5,7,24(24^{1})-trien-3β-ol
- Systematic IUPAC name (1R,3aR,7S,9aR,9bS,11aR)-9a,11a-Dimethyl-1-[(2R)-6-methyl-5-methylideneheptan-2-yl]-2,3,3a,6,7,8,9,9a,9b,10,11,11a-dodecahydro-1H-cyclopenta[a]phenanthren-7-ol
- Other names 24-Methylcholesta-5,7,24(28)-trienol, ergosta-5,7,24(28)-trien-3β-ol, campesta-7,24(28)-dien-3β-ol

Identifiers
CAS Number	23582-83-4
3D model (JSmol)	Interactive image
ChemSpider	9069833
KEGG	C15780
PubChem CID	10894570
UNII	W2W3AHW3TG
CompTox Dashboard (EPA)	DTXSID90447480
- InChI: InChI=1S/C28H44O/c1-18(2)19(3)7-8-20(4)24-11-12-25-23-10-9-21-17-22(29)13-15-27(21,5)26(23)14-16-28(24,25)6/h9-10,18,20,22,24-26,29H,3,7-8,11-17H2,1-2,4-6H3/t20-,22+,24-,25+,26+,27+,28-/m1/s1 Key: ZEPNVCGPJXYABB-LOIOQLKMSA-N; InChI=1/C28H44O/c1-18(2)19(3)7-8-20(4)24-11-12-25-23-10-9-21-17-22(29)13-15-27(21,5)26(23)14-16-28(24,25)6/h9-10,18,20,22,24-26,29H,3,7-8,11-17H2,1-2,4-6H3/t20-,22+,24-,25+,26+,27+,28-/m1/s1 Key: ZEPNVCGPJXYABB-LOIOQLKMBD
- SMILES: O[C@@H]4C/C3=C/C=C1\[C@H](CC[C@]2([C@H]1CC[C@@H]2[C@H](C)CCC(=C)/C(C)C)C)[C@@]3(C)CC4

Properties
Chemical formula	C_{28}H_{44}O
Molar mass	396.648 g·mol^{−1}
- Except where otherwise noted, data are given for materials in their standard state (at 25 °C [77 °F], 100 kPa). verify (what is ?) Infobox references

5-Dehydroepisterol is a sterol and an intermediate in steroid biosynthesis, particularly synthesis of brassinosteroids. It is formed from episterol through action of ERG3, the C-5 sterol desaturase in the yeast and is then converted into 24-methylenecholesterol by 7-dehydrocholesterol reductase.

Episterol and 5-dehydroepisterol are found in Leishmania.
