= Delta24-sterol reductase =

Class of enzymes

delta24-sterol reductase

Identifiers
- EC no.: 1.3.1.72

Databases
- IntEnz: IntEnz view
- BRENDA: BRENDA entry
- ExPASy: NiceZyme view
- KEGG: KEGG entry
- MetaCyc: metabolic pathway
- PRIAM: profile
- PDB structures: RCSB PDB PDBe PDBsum
- Gene Ontology: AmiGO / QuickGO
Search
- PMC: articles
- PubMed: articles
- NCBI: proteins

In enzymology, Delta24-sterol reductase (EC 1.3.1.72) is an enzyme that catalyzes the chemical reaction.

5α-cholesta-7,24-dien-3β-ol
+ NADPH
H^{+}
H^{+}
lathosterol
+ NADP^{+}

The three substrates of this enzyme are 5α-cholesta-7,24-dien-3β-ol, reduced nicotinamide adenine dinucleotide phosphate (NADPH), and a proton. Its products are lathosteol and oxidised NADP^{+}. The enzyme can act on other sterol sidechain double bonds, for example to produce cholesterol and lanosterol.

This enzyme belongs to the family of oxidoreductases, specifically those acting on the CH-CH group of donor with NAD+ or NADP+ as acceptor. The systematic name of this enzyme class is sterol:NADP+ Delta24-oxidoreductase. This enzyme is also called lanosterol Delta24-reductase, and it participates in biosynthesis of steroids.
