= Delta24(241)-sterol reductase =

Class of enzymes

delta24(24-1) sterol reductase

Identifiers
- EC no.: 1.3.1.71

Databases
- IntEnz: IntEnz view
- BRENDA: BRENDA entry
- ExPASy: NiceZyme view
- KEGG: KEGG entry
- MetaCyc: metabolic pathway
- PRIAM: profile
- PDB structures: RCSB PDB PDBe PDBsum
- Gene Ontology: AmiGO / QuickGO
Search
- PMC: articles
- PubMed: articles
- NCBI: proteins

In enzymology, Delta24(241)-sterol reductase (EC 1.3.1.71) is an enzyme that catalyzes the chemical reaction

ergosta-5,7,22,24(28)-tetraen-3β-ol
+ NADPH
H^{+}
H^{+}
ergosterol
+ NADP^{+}

The three substrates of this enzyme are ergosta-5,7,22,24(28)-tetraen-3β-ol, reduced nicotinamide adenine dinucleotide phosphate (NADPH), and a proton. Its products are ergosterol and oxidised NADP^{+}.

This enzyme belongs to the family of oxidoreductases, specifically those acting on the CH-CH group of donor with NAD+ or NADP+ as acceptor. The systematic name of this enzyme class is ergosterol:NADP+ Delta24(241)-oxidoreductase. Other names in common use include sterol Delta24(28)-methylene reductase, and sterol Delta24(28)-reductase. This enzyme participates in biosynthesis of steroids.
