= Lathosterolosis =

Recessive genetic condition

- Other names: SC5D Deficiency, Sterol C5-desaturase deficiency.
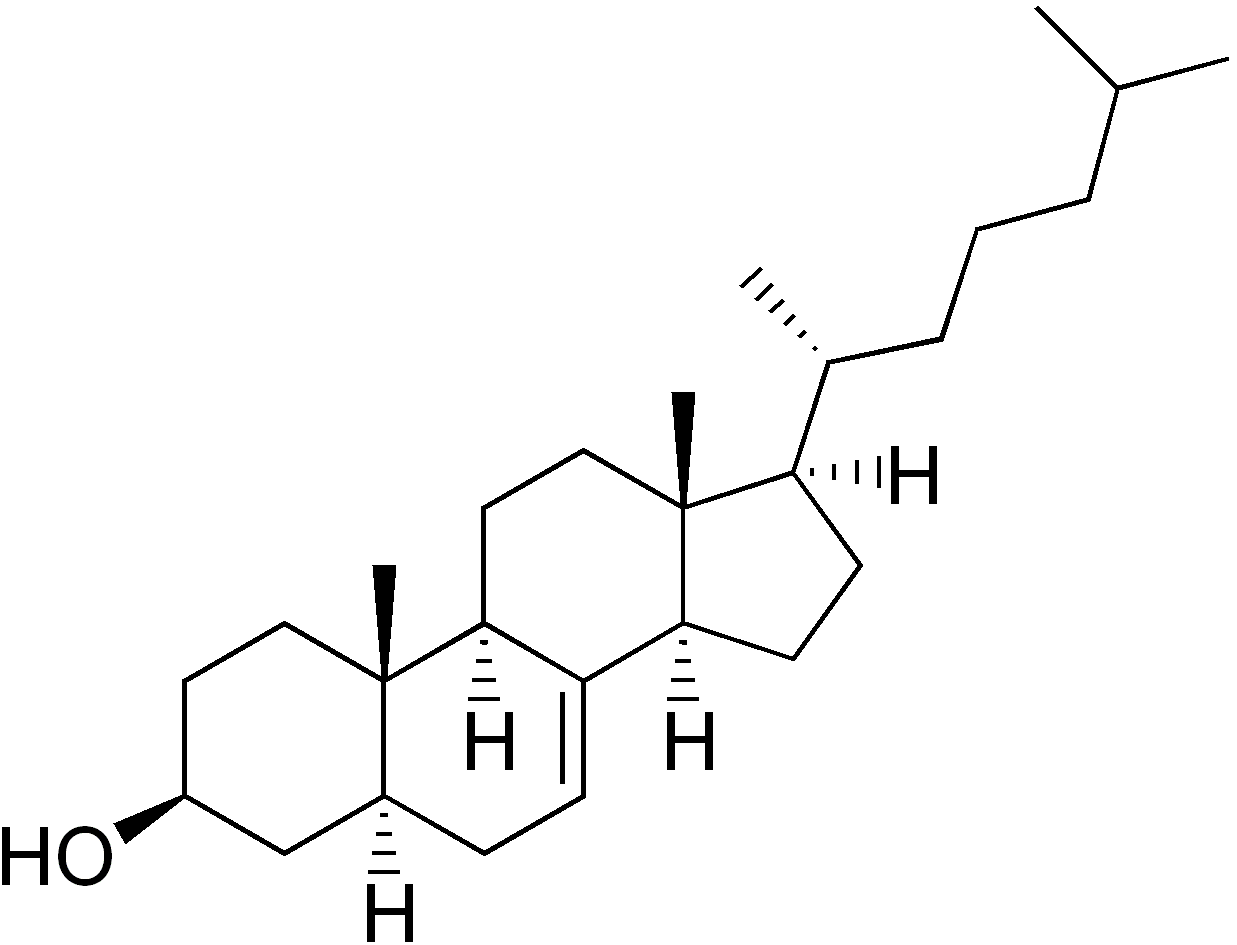
- Lathosterol
- Symptoms: Facial dysmorphism, congenital malformations, failure to thrive, developmental delay, and liver illness.
- Usual onset: Birth.
- Causes: SC5D mutations.
- Differential diagnosis: Smith-Lemli-Opitz syndrome.

Lathosterolosis is an inborn error of cholesterol biosynthesis caused by a deficiency of the enzyme 3-beta-hydroxysteroid-delta-5-desaturase. This leads to a flaw in the conversion of lathosterol to 7-dehydrocholesterol. Characteristics include facial dysmorphism, congenital malformations, failure to thrive, developmental delay, and liver illness. Brunetti-Pierri et al. originally described Lathosterolosis in 2002.
