= Episterol =

Chemical compound

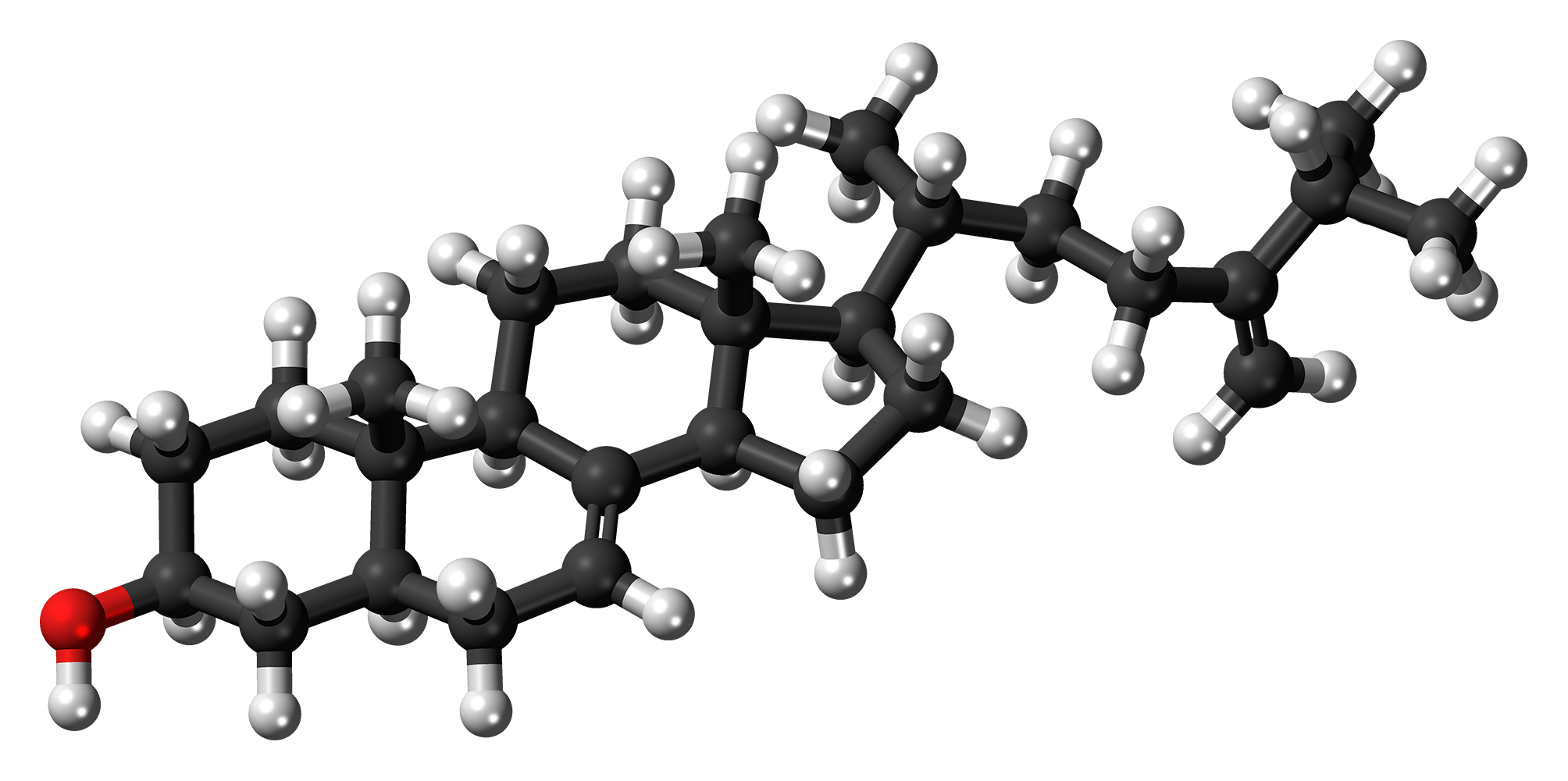

Names
- IUPAC name (3S,5S,10S,13R,14R,17R)-10, 13-dimethyl-17-[(2R)-6-methyl-5-methylideneheptan-2-yl]-2,3,4,5,6,9,11, 12,14,15,16,17-dodecahydro-1H-cyclopenta[a]phenanthren-3-ol
- Systematic IUPAC name (3β,5α)-Ergosta-7,24(28)-dien-3-ol

Identifiers
CAS Number	474-68-0
3D model (JSmol)	Interactive image
Beilstein Reference	2421473
ChEBI	CHEBI:23929
ChemSpider	4446754
KEGG	C15777
MeSH	Episterol
PubChem CID	5283662
CompTox Dashboard (EPA)	DTXSID40963827
- InChI: InChI=1S/C28H46O/c1-18(2)19(3)7-8-20(4)24-11-12-25-23-10-9-21-17-22(29)13-15-27(21,5)26(23)14-16-28(24,25)6/h10,18,20-22,24-26,29H,3,7-9,11-17H2,1-2,4-6H3/t20-,21+,22+,24-,25+,26+,27+,28-/m1/s1 Key: BTCAEOLDEYPGGE-JVAZTMFWSA-N; InChI=1/C28H46O/c1-18(2)19(3)7-8-20(4)24-11-12-25-23-10-9-21-17-22(29)13-15-27(21,5)26(23)14-16-28(24,25)6/h10,18,20-22,24-26,29H,3,7-9,11-17H2,1-2,4-6H3/t20-,21+,22+,24-,25+,26+,27+,28-/m1/s1 Key: BTCAEOLDEYPGGE-JVAZTMFWBW
- SMILES: C[C@H](CCC(=C)C(C)C)[C@H]1CC[C@@H]2[C@@]1(CC[C@H]3C2=CC[C@@H]4[C@@]3(CC[C@@H](C4)O)C)C

Properties
Chemical formula	C_{28}H_{46}O
Molar mass	398.66 g/mol
- Except where otherwise noted, data are given for materials in their standard state (at 25 °C [77 °F], 100 kPa). verify (what is ?) Infobox references

Episterol is a sterol involved in the biosynthesis of steroids. Episterol is synthesized from 24-methylenelophenol. Episterol is converted to 5-dehydroepisterol by ERG3, the C-5 sterol desaturase in the yeast. Episterol is also known to be a precursor to ergosterol.
