= Zymosterone =

Names
- IUPAC name (5S,10S,13R,14R,17R)-10,13-dimethyl-17-[(2R)-6-methylhept-5-en-2-yl]-1,2,4,5,6,7,11,12,14,15,16,17-dodecahydrocyclopenta[a]phenanthren-3-one
- Other names cholesta-8(9),24-dien-3-one; zymosterol intermediate 2

Identifiers
CAS Number	27192-37-6
3D model (JSmol)	Interactive image
ChEBI	CHEBI:52386
KEGG	C22136
PubChem CID	22298942
CompTox Dashboard (EPA)	DTXSID801344697
- InChI: InChI=1S/C27H42O/c1-18(2)7-6-8-19(3)23-11-12-24-22-10-9-20-17-21(28)13-15-26(20,4)25(22)14-16-27(23,24)5/h7,19-20,23-24H,6,8-17H2,1-5H3/t19-,20?,23?,24?,26+,27-/m1/s1 Key: AUNLIRXIJAVBNM-ZSFXRWSJSA-N
- SMILES: C[C@]1(CC2)C(CCC3=C1CC[C@@]4(C)C3CCC4[C@@H](CCC=C(C)C)C)CC2=O

Properties
Chemical formula	C_{27}H_{42}O
Molar mass	382.632 g·mol^{−1}
- Except where otherwise noted, data are given for materials in their standard state (at 25 °C [77 °F], 100 kPa). (what is ?) Infobox references

Zymosterone is a synthetic anabolic steroid that has been studied for its potential use in veterinary medicine and as a growth promoter in livestock. The compound is structurally related to testosterone and is known for its strong anabolic effects with relatively low androgenic activity.

== Uses ==
Zymosterone, NADPH and H(+) react to produce zymosterol and NADP(+). This reaction takes place in the endoplasmic reticulum, catalyzed by HSD17B7.

The conversion of zymosterone to zymosterol plays an important role in the synthesis of ergosterol, a crucial component for maintaining the structure and functionality of fungal cell membranes. Similar to how cholesterol functions in animal cells, ergosterol supports the membrane's stability and participates in multiple cellular activities.
