= 7-Dehydrocholesterol =

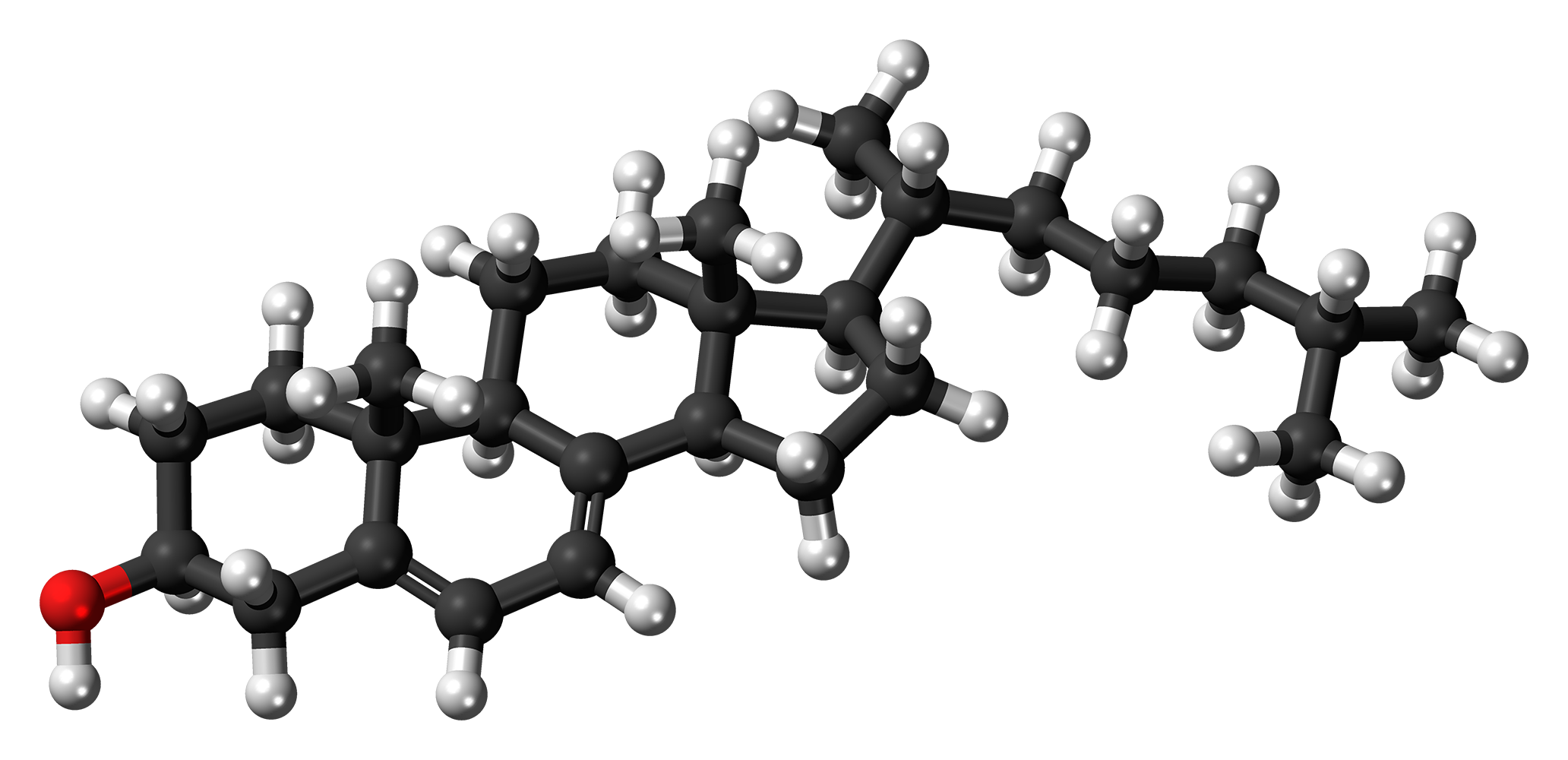

Names
- IUPAC name Cholesta-5,7-dien-3β-ol
- Systematic IUPAC name (1R,3aR,7S,9aR,9bS,11aR)-9a,11a-Dimethyl-1-[(2R)-6-methylheptan-2-yl]-2,3,3a,6,7,8,9,9a,9b,10,11,11a-dodecahydro-1H-cyclopenta[a]phenanthren-7-ol

Identifiers
CAS Number	434-16-2
3D model (JSmol)	Interactive image
ChEBI	CHEBI:17759
ChemSpider	388534
ECHA InfoCard	100.006.456
MeSH	7-dehydrocholesterol
PubChem CID	172
UNII	BK1IU07GKF
CompTox Dashboard (EPA)	DTXSID20861933
- InChI: InChI=1S/C27H44O/c1-18(2)7-6-8-19(3)23-11-12-24-22-10-9-20-17-21(28)13-15-26(20,4)25(22)14-16-27(23,24)5/h9-10,18-19,21,23-25,28H,6-8,11-17H2,1-5H3/t19-,21+,23-,24+,25+,26+,27-/m1/s1-dehydrocholesterol Key: UCTLRSWJYQTBFZ-DDPQNLDTSA-N; InChI=1/C27H44O/c1-18(2)7-6-8-19(3)23-11-12-24-22-10-9-20-17-21(28)13-15-26(20,4)25(22)14-16-27(23,24)5/h9-10,18-19,21,23-25,28H,6-8,11-17H2,1-5H3/t19-,21+,23-,24+,25+,26+,27-/m1/s1 Key: UCTLRSWJYQTBFZ-DDPQNLDTBZ
- SMILES: O[C@@H]4C/C3=C/C=C1\[C@H](CC[C@]2([C@H]1CC[C@@H]2[C@H](C)CCCC(C)C)C)[C@@]3(C)CC4

Properties
Chemical formula	C_{27}H_{44}O
Molar mass	384.638
- Except where otherwise noted, data are given for materials in their standard state (at 25 °C [77 °F], 100 kPa). verify (what is ?) Infobox references

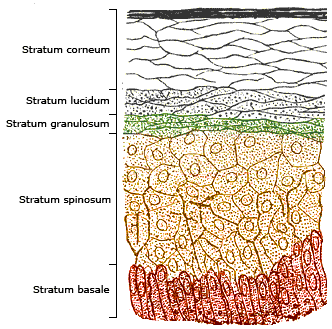
The epidermal strata of the skin

7-Dehydrocholesterol (7-DHC) is a zoosterol that functions in the serum as a cholesterol precursor, and is photochemically converted to vitamin D_{3} in the skin, therefore functioning as provitamin-D_{3}. The presence of this compound in human skin enables humans to manufacture vitamin D_{3} (cholecalciferol). Upon exposure to ultraviolet UV-B rays in the sun light, 7-DHC is converted into vitamin D_{3} via previtamin D_{3} as an intermediate isomer. It is also found in the milk of several mammalian species. Lanolin, a waxy substance that is naturally secreted by wool-bearing mammals, contains 7-DHC which is converted into vitamin D by sunlight and then ingested during grooming as a nutrient. In insects 7-dehydrocholesterol is a precursor for the hormone ecdysone, required for reaching adulthood. 7-DHC was discovered by Nobel-laureate organic chemist Adolf Windaus.

== Biosynthesis ==
It is synthesized from lathosterol by the enzyme lathosterol oxidase (lathosterol 5-desaturase). This is the next-to-last step of cholesterol biosynthesis. Defective synthesis results in the human inherited disorder lathosterolosis resembling Smith–Lemli–Opitz syndrome. Mice where this gene has been deleted lose the ability to increase vitamin D_{3} in the blood following UV exposure of the skin.

== Location ==
The skin consists of two primary layers: an inner layer, the dermis, comprising largely connective tissue, and an outer, thinner epidermis. The thickness of the epidermis ranges from 0.04 mm to greater than 0.6 mm. The epidermis comprises five strata; from outer to inner, they are the stratum corneum, stratum lucidum, stratum granulosum, stratum spinosum, and stratum basale. The highest concentrations of 7-dehydrocholesterol are found in the epidermal layer of skin—specifically in the stratum basale and stratum spinosum. The production of pre-vitamin D_{3} is, therefore, greatest in these two layers.

== Radiation ==
Synthesis of pre-vitamin D_{3} in the skin involves UVB radiation, which effectively penetrates only the epidermal layers of skin. 7-Dehydrocholesterol absorbs UV light most effectively at wavelengths between 295 and 300 nm and, thus, the production of vitamin D_{3} will occur primarily at those wavelengths. The two most important factors that govern the generation of pre-vitamin D_{3} are the quantity (intensity) and quality (appropriate wavelength) of the UVB irradiation reaching the 7-dehydrocholesterol deep in the stratum basale and stratum spinosum. Light-emitting diodes (LEDs) can be used to produce the radiation.

Another important consideration is the quantity of 7-dehydrocholesterol present in the skin. Under normal circumstances, ample quantities of 7-dehydrocholesterol (about 25–50 μg/cm^{2} of skin) are available in the stratum spinosum and stratum basale of human skin to meet the body's vitamin D requirements. 7-DHC insufficiency has been proposed as an alternate cause for Vitamin D deficiency.

== Sources ==
7-DHC can be produced by animals and plants via different pathways. It is not produced by fungi in significant amounts. It is made by some algae, but the pathway is poorly understood.

Industrially, 7-DHC generally comes from lanolin, and is used to produce vitamin D3 by UV exposure. Lichen (Cladonia rangiferina) is used to produce vegan D3.

7-DHC is used for vitamin D3 synthesis via lanosterol in land animals, via cycloartenol in plants, and in algae together with another provitamin D ergosterol for D2. In fungi solely ergosterol is used for synthesis of D2 via lanosterol.

== Interactive pathway map ==
Click on genes, proteins and metabolites below to link to respective articles. (Note: The interactive pathway map can be edited at WikiPathways: "VitaminDSynthesis_WP1531".)

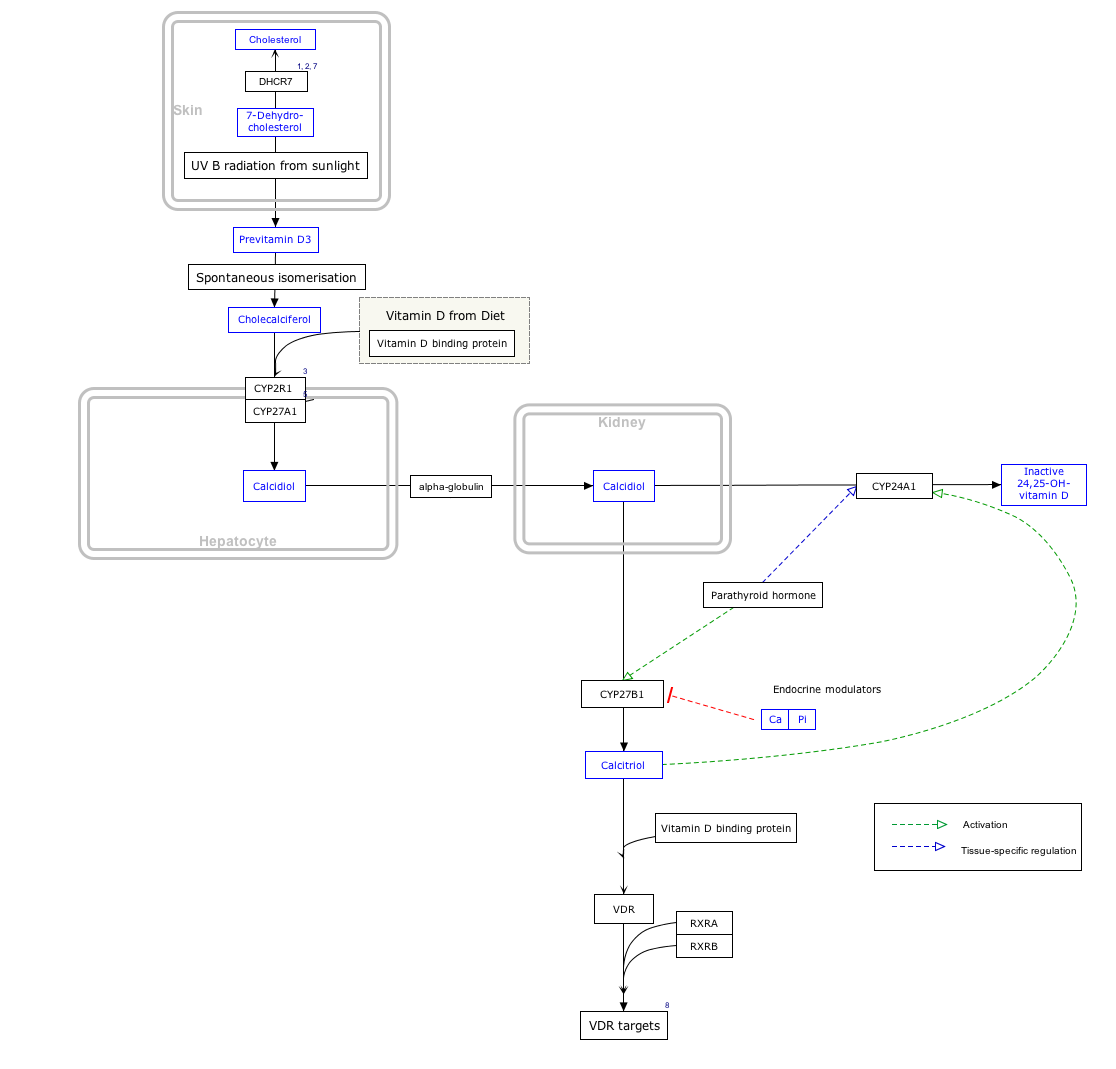

Vitamin D Synthesis Pathway (view / edit)

== See also ==
- Vitamin D
- Smith–Lemli–Opitz syndrome
- 7-Dehydrocholesterol reductase
