= 7-Dehydrodesmosterol =

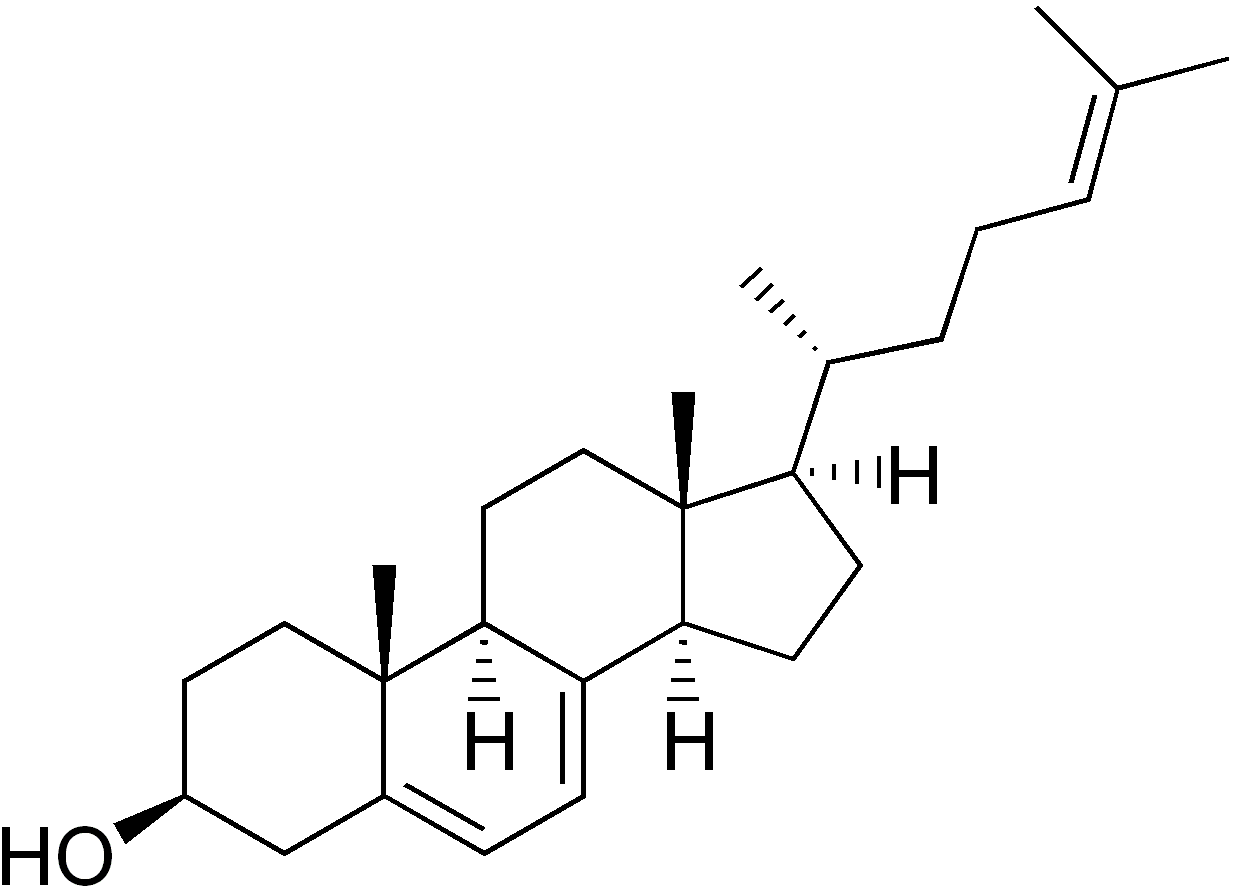

Names
- IUPAC name Cholesta-5,7,24-trien-3β-ol
- Systematic IUPAC name (1R,3aR,7S,9aR,9bS,11aR)-9a,11a-Dimethyl-1-[(2R)-6-methylhept-5-en-2-yl]-2,3,3a,6,7,8,9,9a,9b,10,11,11a-dodecahydro-1H-cyclopenta[a]phenanthren-7-ol
- Other names 24-Dehydroprovitamin D3

Identifiers
CAS Number	143982-69-8
3D model (JSmol)	Interactive image; Interactive image
ChEBI	CHEBI:27910
ChemSpider	389458
PubChem CID	440558
CompTox Dashboard (EPA)	DTXSID801028219
- InChI: InChI=1S/C27H42O/c1-18(2)7-6-8-19(3)23-11-12-24-22-10-9-20-17-21(28)13-15-26(20,4)25(22)14-16-27(23,24)5/h7,9-10,19,21,23-25,28H,6,8,11-17H2,1-5H3/t19-,21+,23-,24+,25+,26+,27-/m1/s1 Key: RUSSPKPUXDSHNC-DDPQNLDTSA-N; InChI=1/C27H42O/c1-18(2)7-6-8-19(3)23-11-12-24-22-10-9-20-17-21(28)13-15-26(20,4)25(22)14-16-27(23,24)5/h7,9-10,19,21,23-25,28H,6,8,11-17H2,1-5H3/t19-,21+,23-,24+,25+,26+,27-/m1/s1 Key: RUSSPKPUXDSHNC-DDPQNLDTBA
- SMILES: C[C@H](CCC=C(C)C)[C@H]1CC[C@@H]2[C@@]1(CC[C@H]3C2=CC=C4[C@@]3(CC[C@@H](C4)O)C)C; O[C@@H]4C/C3=C/C=C1\[C@H](CC[C@]2([C@H]1CC[C@@H]2[C@H](C)CCC=C(C)C)C)[C@@]3(C)CC4

Properties
Chemical formula	C_{27}H_{42}O
Molar mass	382.62 g/mol
- Except where otherwise noted, data are given for materials in their standard state (at 25 °C [77 °F], 100 kPa). verify (what is ?) Infobox references

7-Dehydrodesmosterol (or cholesta-5,7,24-trien-3-beta-ol) is a cholesterol intermediate.
