= 7-Dehydrocholesterol reductase =

Mammalian protein found in humans

DHCR7

Identifiers
- Aliases: DHCR7, SLOS, 7-dehydrocholesterol reductase
- External IDs: OMIM: 602858; MGI: 1298378; GeneCards: DHCR7
Enzyme activity
EC #	BRENDA	ExPASy	KEGG	MetaCyc
1.3.1.21	↗	↗	↗	↗
3.3.2.11	↗	↗	↗	↗

Gene location (Human)
Chr.	Chromosome 11 (human)
Band	11q13.4	Start	71,428,193 bp
Band	11q13.4	End	71,452,868 bp

Gene location (Mouse)
Chr.	Chromosome 7 (mouse)
Band	7|7 F5	Start	143,376,882 bp
Band	7|7 F5	End	143,402,147 bp
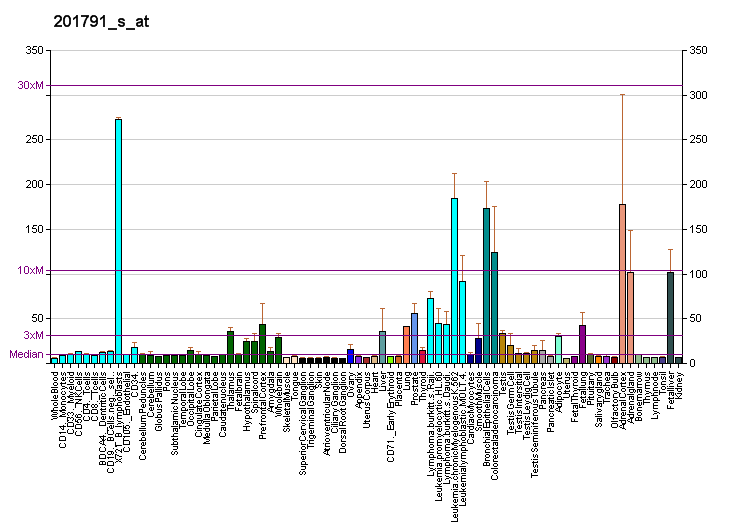

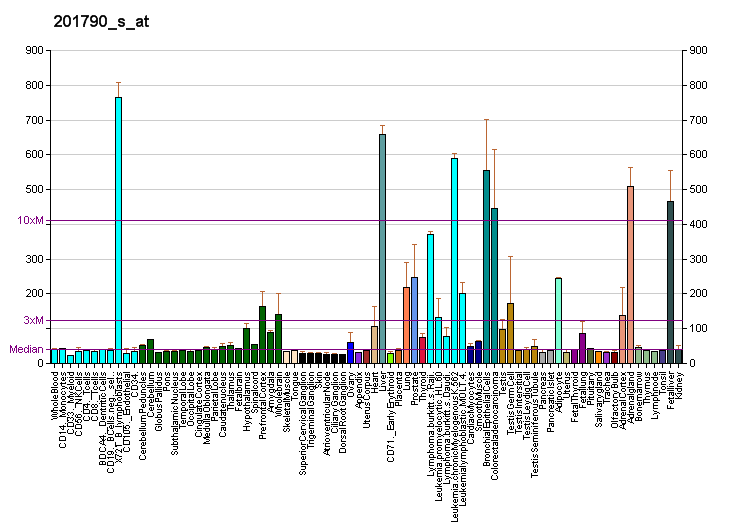
RNA expression pattern
Bgee	Human / Mouse (ortholog); Top expressed in: right lobe of liver; right adrenal cortex; oocyte; islet of Langerhans; left adrenal cortex; secondary oocyte; skin of leg; C1 segment; skin of abdomen; corpus epididymis / Top expressed in: adrenal gland; lip; cumulus cell; motor neuron; left lobe of liver; skin of external ear; Gonadal ridge; left colon; condyle; ectoderm; More reference expression data
BioGPS	More reference expression data
Gene ontology
Molecular function	oxidoreductase activity, acting on the CH-CH group of donors, NAD or NADP as acceptor; oxidoreductase activity; NADP binding; 7-dehydrocholesterol reductase activity; sterol delta7 reductase activity
Cellular component	integral component of membrane; endoplasmic reticulum membrane; membrane; intracellular membrane-bounded organelle; integral component of endoplasmic reticulum membrane; endoplasmic reticulum; nuclear outer membrane; cytosol
Biological process	cell differentiation; steroid metabolic process; sterol biosynthetic process; multicellular organism growth; lung development; lipid metabolism; cholesterol metabolic process; post-embryonic development; blood vessel development; regulation of cell population proliferation; cholesterol biosynthetic process via lathosterol; cholesterol biosynthetic process via desmosterol; steroid biosynthetic process; cholesterol biosynthetic process; brassinosteroid biosynthetic process; regulation of cholesterol biosynthetic process
Sources:Amigo / QuickGO
Orthologs
Databases	NCBI: entry; OMA: entry
Species	Human	Mouse
Entrez	1717	13360
Ensembl	ENSG00000172893	ENSMUSG00000058454
UniProt	Q9UBM7	O88455
RefSeq (mRNA)	NM_001163817; NM_001360	NM_007856; NM_001382498; NM_001382499; NM_001382500; NM_001382501 NM_001382502; NM_001382503
RefSeq (protein)	NP_001157289; NP_001351	NP_031882; NP_001369427; NP_001369428; NP_001369429; NP_001369430 NP_001369431; NP_001369432
Location (UCSC)	Chr 11: 71.43 – 71.45 Mb	Chr 7: 143.38 – 143.4 Mb
PubMed search
- Wikidata
View/Edit Human	View/Edit Mouse

7-dehydrocholesterol reductase

Identifiers
- EC no.: 1.3.1.21
- CAS no.: 9080-21-1

Databases
- BRENDA: enzyme data
- ExPASy: NiceZyme view
- KEGG: enzyme entry
- MetaCyc: metabolic pathway
- Rhea: reactions
- PDB structures: RCSB PDB PDBe PDBsum
- Gene Ontology: AmiGO / QuickGO
Search
- PMC: articles
- PubMed: articles
- NCBI: proteins

7-Dehydrocholesterol reductase, also known as DHCR7, is a protein that in humans is encoded by the DHCR7 gene.

== Function ==
The protein encoded by this gene is an enzyme catalyzing the reversible production of cholesterol from 7-dehydrocholesterol using nicotinamide adenine dinucleotide phosphate (NADPH) as its cofactor.

7-Dehydrocholesterol
+ NADPH
H^{+}
H^{+}
Cholesterol
+ NADP^{+}

The DHCR7 gene encodes delta-7-sterol reductase (EC 1.3.1.21), the ultimate enzyme of mammalian sterol biosynthesis that converts 7-dehydrocholesterol (7-DHC) to cholesterol. This enzyme removes the C(7–8) double bond introduced by the sterol delta8-delta7 isomerases. In addition, its role in drug-induced malformations is known: inhibitors of the last step of cholesterol biosynthesis such as AY9944 and BM15766 severely impair brain development.

It displays a modest level of enzyme promiscuity, being able to catalyze analogous reactions with (substrate in forward direction) brassicasterol, 20S(OH)7DHC, 27(OH)DHC and 7-dehydrodesmosterol.

== Pathology ==
A deficiency is associated with Smith–Lemli–Opitz syndrome.

All house cats and dogs have higher-than-usual activity of this enzyme, causing an inability to synthesize vitamin D due to the lack of 7-dehydrocholesterol.

== Interactive pathway map ==
Click on genes, proteins and metabolites below to link to respective articles. (Note: The interactive pathway map can be edited at WikiPathways: "VitaminDSynthesis_WP1531".)

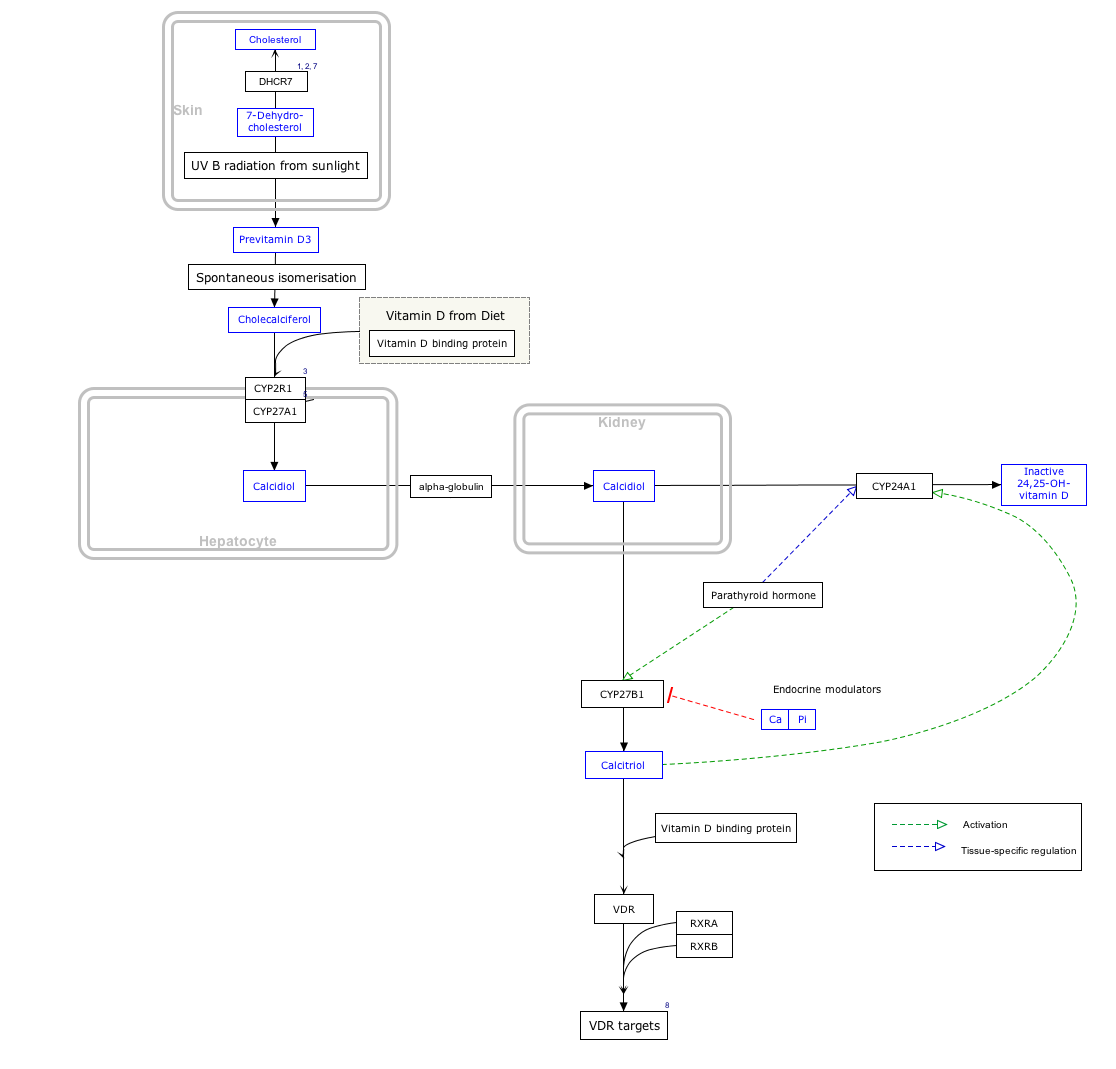

Vitamin D Synthesis Pathway (view / edit)

== See also ==
- Steroidogenic enzyme
