= Lathosterol =

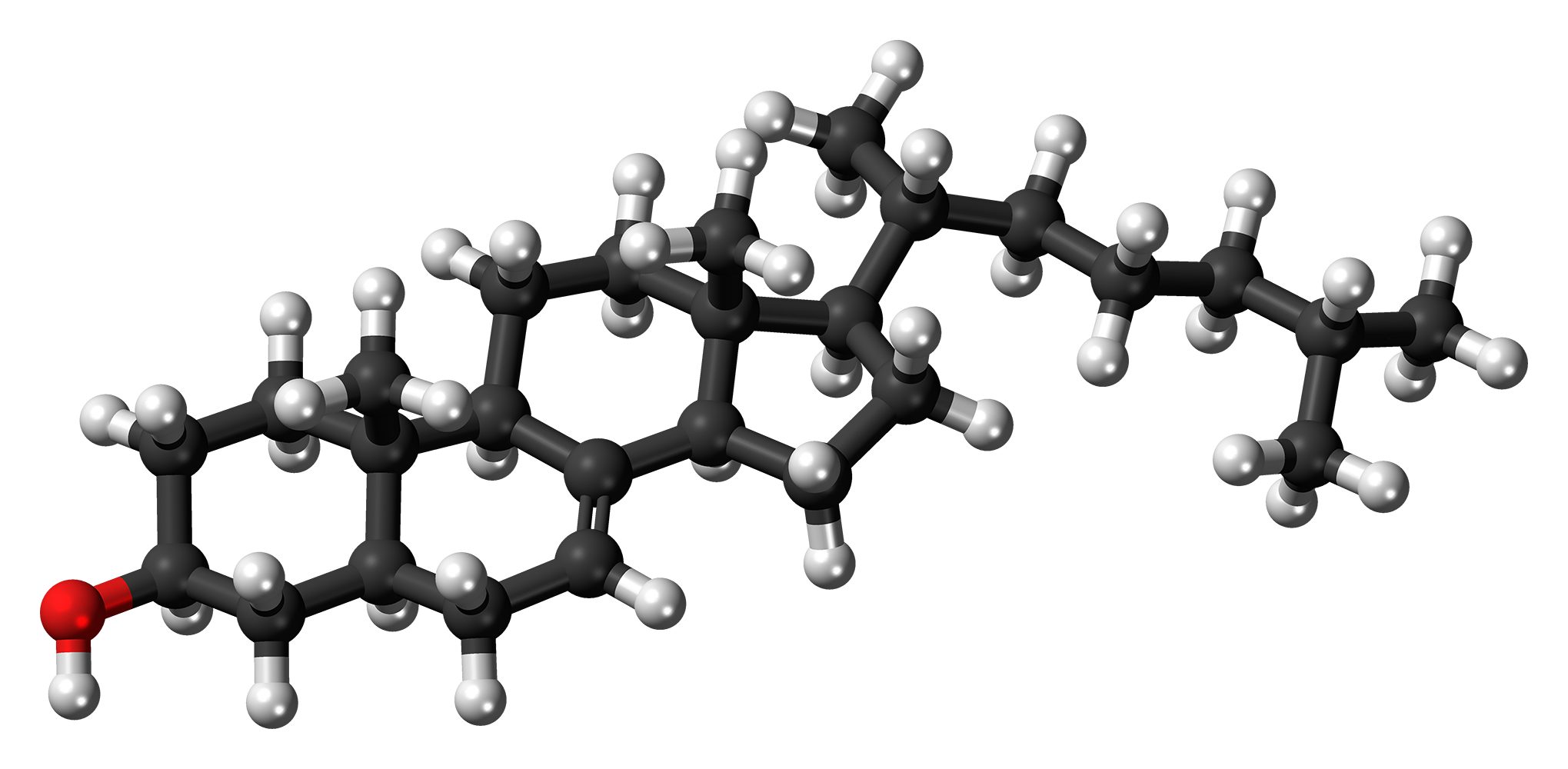

Names
- IUPAC name 5α-Cholest-7-en-3β-ol
- Systematic IUPAC name (1R,3aR,5aS,7S,9aS,9bR,11aR)-9a,11a-Dimethyl-1-[(2R)-6-methylheptan-2-yl]-2,3,3a,5,5a,6,7,8,9,9a,9b,10,11,11a-tetradecahydro-1H-cyclopenta[a]phenanthren-7-ol

Identifiers
CAS Number	80-99-9
3D model (JSmol)	Interactive image
ChEBI	CHEBI:17168
ChemSpider	59151
PubChem CID	65728
- InChI: InChI=1S/C27H46O/c1-18(2)7-6-8-19(3)23-11-12-24-22-10-9-20-17-21(28)13-15-26(20,4)25(22)14-16-27(23,24)5/h10,18-21,23-25,28H,6-9,11-17H2,1-5H3/t19-,20+,21+,23-,24+,25+,26+,27-/m1/s1 Key: IZVFFXVYBHFIHY-SKCNUYALSA-N; InChI=1/C27H46O/c1-18(2)7-6-8-19(3)23-11-12-24-22-10-9-20-17-21(28)13-15-26(20,4)25(22)14-16-27(23,24)5/h10,18-21,23-25,28H,6-9,11-17H2,1-5H3/t19-,20+,21+,23-,24+,25+,26+,27-/m1/s1 Key: IZVFFXVYBHFIHY-SKCNUYALBG
- SMILES: O[C@H]1CC[C@@]2([C@@H]3\C(=C/C[C@H]2C1)[C@@H]4CC[C@H]([C@H](C)CCCC(C)C)[C@]4(CC3)C)C

Properties
Chemical formula	C_{27}H_{46}O
Molar mass	386.65 g/mol
- Except where otherwise noted, data are given for materials in their standard state (at 25 °C [77 °F], 100 kPa). Infobox references

Lathosterol is a cholesterol-like molecule found in small amounts in humans. The enzyme Δ7-sterol 5(6)-desaturase converts it to 7-dehydrocholesterol. It is accumulated in lathosterolosis.

== Biosynthesis ==
The final step in the biosynthesis of lathosterol is by reduction of the double bond in the sidechain of the sterol 5α-cholesta-7,24-dien-3β-ol when acted on by the enzyme Δ^{24}-sterol reductase, which uses nicotinamide adenine dinucleotide phosphate (NADPH) as its cofactor.

5α-cholesta-7,24-dien-3β-ol
+ NADPH
H^{+}
H^{+}
lathosterol
+ NADP^{+}

== In cholesterol biosynthesis ==
In vertebrates, lathosterol is an intermediate in the pathway to cholesterol via 7-dehydrocholesterol. The enzyme Δ7-sterol 5(6)-desaturase catalyses the oxidation reaction:

lathosterol
+ 2 Fe^{2+} + 2 H^{+}
O_{2}
2 H_{2}O
O_{2}
2 H_{2}O
7-dehydrocholesterol
+ 2 Fe^{3+}

It uses two molecules of the cofactor ferrocytochrome b_{5} with two protons and one oxygen for each molecule of lathosterol converted.

== See also ==
- Lathosterol oxidase
