= Sterol-C5-desaturase-like =

Protein-coding gene in the species Homo sapiens

SC5D

Identifiers
- Aliases: SC5D, ERG3, S5DES, SC5DL, Sterol-C5-desaturase-like, sterol-C5-desaturase
- External IDs: OMIM: 602286; MGI: 1353611; GeneCards: SC5D
Enzyme activity
EC #	BRENDA	ExPASy	KEGG	MetaCyc
1.14.19.20	↗	↗	↗	↗

Gene location (Human)
Chr.	Chromosome 11 (human)
Band	11q23.3-q24.1	Start	121,292,681 bp
Band	11q23.3-q24.1	End	121,313,410 bp

Gene location (Mouse)
Chr.	Chromosome 9 (mouse)
Band	9|9 A5.1	Start	42,162,891 bp
Band	9|9 A5.1	End	42,175,552 bp
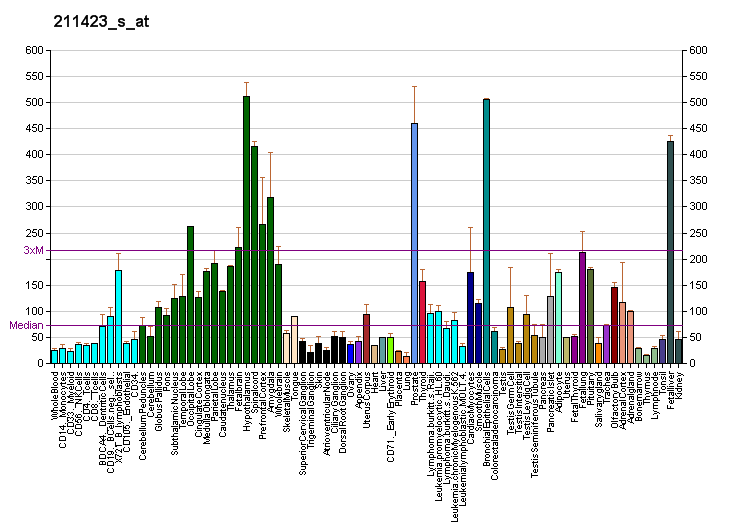
RNA expression pattern
Bgee	Human / Mouse (ortholog); Top expressed in: pons; right lobe of liver; corpus epididymis; seminal vesicula; jejunal mucosa; islet of Langerhans; superior vestibular nucleus; vulva; ganglionic eminence; retinal pigment epithelium / Top expressed in: left lobe of liver; seminal vesicula; jejunum; epithelium of stomach; anterior horn of spinal cord; white adipose tissue; calvaria; esophagus; subcutaneous adipose tissue; ileum; More reference expression data
BioGPS	More reference expression data
Gene ontology
Molecular function	iron ion binding; oxidoreductase activity; delta7-sterol 5(6)-desaturase activity; C-5 sterol desaturase activity
Cellular component	integral component of membrane; endoplasmic reticulum; membrane; intracellular membrane-bounded organelle; endoplasmic reticulum membrane
Biological process	steroid metabolic process; sterol biosynthetic process; cholesterol biosynthetic process via desmosterol; lipid metabolism; steroid biosynthetic process; cholesterol biosynthetic process via lathosterol; lipid biosynthetic process; regulation of cholesterol biosynthetic process
Sources:Amigo / QuickGO
Orthologs
Databases	NCBI: entry; OMA: entry
Species	Human	Mouse
Entrez	6309	235293
Ensembl	ENSG00000109929	ENSMUSG00000032018
UniProt	O75845	O88822
RefSeq (mRNA)	NM_006918; NM_001024956	NM_172769
RefSeq (protein)	NP_001020127; NP_008849	NP_766357
Location (UCSC)	Chr 11: 121.29 – 121.31 Mb	Chr 9: 42.16 – 42.18 Mb
PubMed search
- Wikidata
View/Edit Human	View/Edit Mouse

Lathosterol oxidase is a Δ7-sterol 5(6)-desaturase enzyme that in humans is encoded by the SC5D gene.

This gene encodes an enzyme of cholesterol biosynthesis. The encoded protein catalyzes the conversion of lathosterol into 7-dehydrocholesterol. Mutations in this gene have been associated with lathosterolosis. Alternatively spliced transcript variants encoding the same protein have been described.
