= Ergosterol =

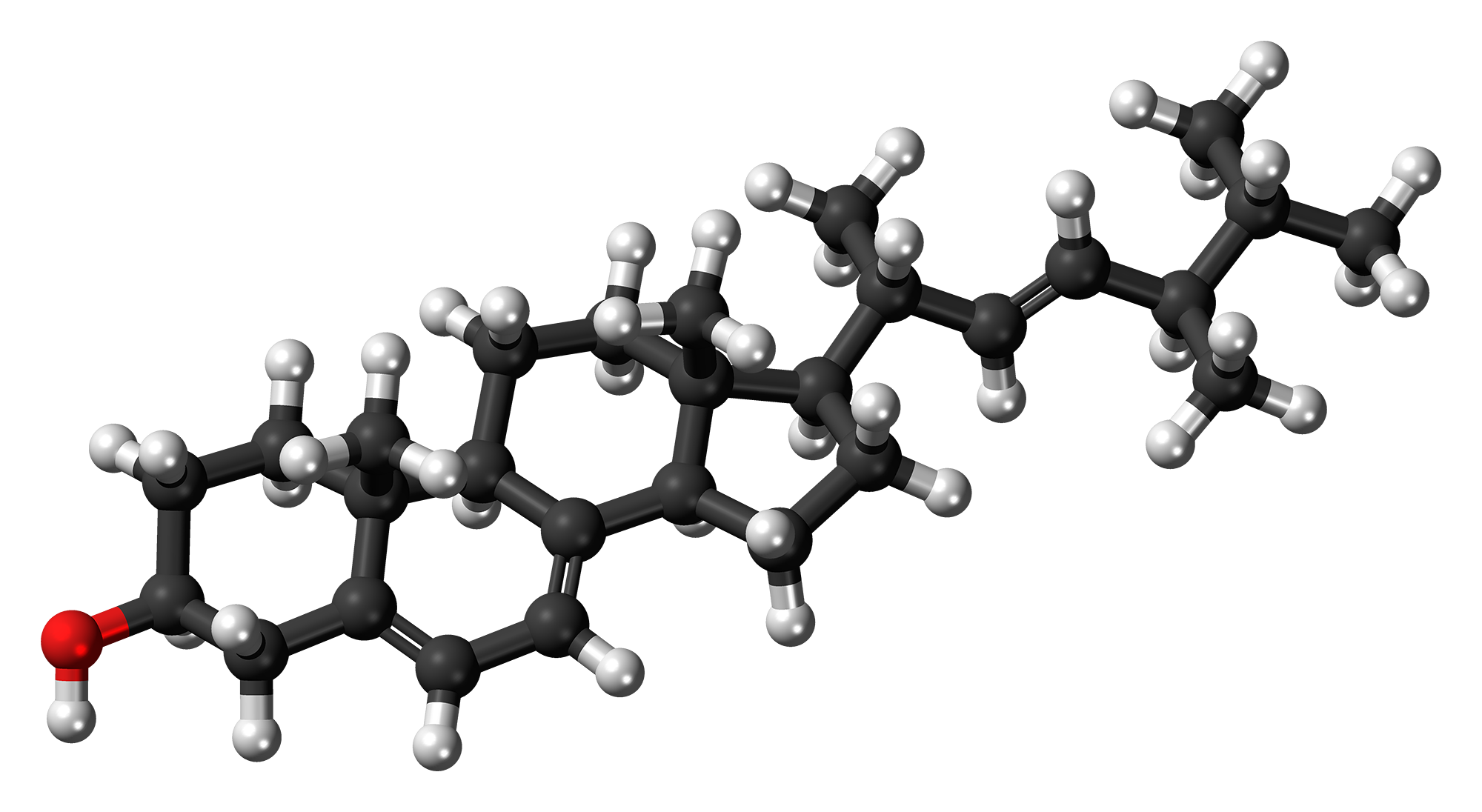

Names
- IUPAC name (22E)-Ergosta-5,7,22-trien-3β-ol
- Systematic IUPAC name (1R,3aR,7S,9aR,9bS,11aR)-1-[(2R,3E,5R)-5,6-Dimethylhept-3-en-2-yl]-7-hydroxy-9a,11a-dimethyl-2,3,3a,6,7,8,9,9a,9b,10,11,11a-dodecahydro-1H-cyclopenta[a]phenanthren-7-ol

Identifiers
CAS Number	57-87-4
3D model (JSmol)	Interactive image
ChEBI	CHEBI:16933
ChEMBL	ChEMBL1232562
ChemSpider	392539
ECHA InfoCard	100.000.320
EC Number	200-352-7
MeSH	Ergosterol
PubChem CID	444679
UNII	Z30RAY509F
CompTox Dashboard (EPA)	DTXSID90878679
- InChI: InChI=1S/C28H44O/c1-18(2)19(3)7-8-20(4)24-11-12-25-23-10-9-21-17-22(29)13-15-27(21,5)26(23)14-16-28(24,25)6/h7-10,18-20,22,24-26,29H,11-17H2,1-6H3/b8-7+/t19-,20+,22-,24+,25-,26-,27-,28+/m0/s1 Key: DNVPQKQSNYMLRS-APGDWVJJSA-N; InChI=1/C28H44O/c1-18(2)19(3)7-8-20(4)24-11-12-25-23-10-9-21-17-22(29)13-15-27(21,5)26(23)14-16-28(24,25)6/h7-10,18-20,22,24-26,29H,11-17H2,1-6H3/b8-7+/t19-,20+,22-,24+,25-,26-,27-,28+/m0/s1 Key: DNVPQKQSNYMLRS-APGDWVJJBI
- SMILES: O[C@@H]4C/C3=C/C=C1\[C@H](CC[C@]2([C@H]1CC[C@@H]2[C@@H](/C=C/[C@H](C)C(C)C)C)C)[C@@]3(C)CC4

Properties
Chemical formula	C_{28}H_{44}O
Molar mass	396.65 g/mol
Melting point	160 °C (320 °F; 433 K)
Boiling point	250 °C (482 °F; 523 K)
Magnetic susceptibility (χ)	−279.6·10^{−6} cm^{3}/mol
- Except where otherwise noted, data are given for materials in their standard state (at 25 °C [77 °F], 100 kPa). Infobox references

Ergosterol (ergosta-5,7,22-trien-3β-ol) is a mycosterol found in cell membranes of fungi and protozoa, serving many of the same functions that cholesterol serves in animal cells. Because many fungi and protozoa cannot survive without ergosterol, the enzymes that synthesize it have become important targets for drug discovery. In human nutrition, ergosterol is a provitamin form of vitamin D_{2}; exposure to ultraviolet (UV) light causes a chemical reaction that produces vitamin D_{2}.

== Role in fungi ==
Ergosterol (ergosta-5,7,22-trien-3β-ol) is a sterol found in fungi, and named after ergot, the common name of members of the fungal genus Claviceps from which ergosterol was first isolated. Ergosterol is a component of yeast and other fungal cell membranes, serving many of the same functions that cholesterol serves in animal cells. Its specificity in higher fungi is thought to be related to the climatic instabilities (highly varying humidity and moisture conditions) encountered by these organisms in their typical ecological niches (plant and animal surfaces, soil). Thus, despite the added energy requirements of ergosterol synthesis (if compared to cholesterol), ergosterol is thought to have evolved as a nearly ubiquitous, evolutionarily advantageous fungal alternative to cholesterol. This advantage could be linked to the presence of two conjugated double bonds in the structure (B-ring) of ergosterol giving it antioxidant properties. Additionally, the structure of ergosterol appears to have been finely tuned towards optimal interaction with saturated lipids.

== Biosynthesis ==
The immediate precursor of ergosterol in yeasts is ergosta-5,7,22,24(28)-tetraen-3β-ol. One of its double bonds is reduced by the enzyme Δ^{24(24^{1})}-sterol reductase, which uses nicotinamide adenine dinucleotide phosphate (NADPH) as its cofactor.

ergosta-5,7,22,24(28)-tetraen-3β-ol
+ NADPH
H^{+}
H^{+}
ergosterol
+ NADP^{+}

== As a vitamin D_{2} precursor ==
Ergosterol is a biological precursor of vitamin D_{2}, the chemical name of which is ergocalciferol. Exposure of white button mushrooms to UV-C irradiation produces time-dependent increases in vitamin D2 concentrations in the mushrooms. Fungi are grown industrially to enable ergosterol extraction and preparation as a powder for sale as a vitamin D_{2} dietary supplement and food additive.

Preparations of irradiated ergosterol containing a mixture of previtamin and vitamin D_{2} were called viosterol in the 1930s.

== Target for antifungal drugs ==
Because ergosterol is present in cell membranes of fungi, yet absent in those of animals, it is a useful target for antifungal drugs. Ergosterol is also present in the cell membranes of some protists, such as trypanosomes. This is the basis for the use of some antifungals against West African sleeping sickness.

Amphotericin B, an antifungal drug, targets ergosterol. It binds physically to ergosterol within the membrane, thus creating a polar pore in fungal membranes. This causes ions (predominantly potassium and protons) and other molecules to leak out, which will kill the cell. Amphotericin B has been replaced by safer agents in most circumstances, but is still used, despite its side effects, for life-threatening fungal or protozoan infections.

Fluconazole, miconazole, itraconazole, clotrimazole, and myclobutanil work in a different way, inhibiting synthesis of ergosterol from lanosterol by interfering with 14α-demethylase. Ergosterol is a smaller molecule than lanosterol; it is synthesized by combining two molecules of farnesyl pyrophosphate, a 15-carbon-long terpenoid, into lanosterol, which has 30 carbons. Then, two methyl groups are removed, making ergosterol. The "azole" class of antifungal agents inhibit the enzyme that performs these demethylation steps in the biosynthetic pathway between lanosterol and ergosterol.

== Target for antiprotozoal drugs ==
Some protozoa, including Trichomonas and Leishmania are inhibited by drugs that target ergosterol synthesis and function

== Safety ==
Ergosterol powder is a mechanical irritant to skin, eyes, and the respiratory tract. Ingestion may cause gastrointestinal irritation with vomiting, nausea, and diarrhea.

=== Toxicity ===
Ergosterol itself has no vitamin D activity and does not cause poisoning via this mechanism. Ergosterol added to rat food at 1% dry weight did not cause toxic effects. Ergosterol is not classifiable under GHS or REACH.

The safety data sheets for ergosterol commonly confuse it with ergocalciferol (vitamin D_{2}), (Note: The SDS that correctly identify this issue are already cited before. The MSDS for ergosterol from Fisher Scientific includes a misleading but correct note that "Ingestion of large amounts of vitamin D may result in . [...] Prolonged hypercalcemia may result in a deposition of calcium salts in the soft tissues, most significantly the kidney." but it does not make the claim of ergosterol having a vitamin D activity at any point. The MSDS from Cayman Chem reports an unreasonably low oral LD50 of 10 mg/kg, which is not possible giving the rat feeding stufy quoted. More reputable sources such as Sigma-Alderich generally report the oral LD50 of ergocalciferol at 10 mg/kg, which is strongly suggestive of confusion.) which due to having vitamin D activity is hazardous in relatively small amounts, being able to cause hypercalcemia via Vitamin D toxicity. Historical cases of poisoning are attributed to irradiated ergosterol, which contains vitamin D_{2} in addition to ergosterol. These do not constitute evidence for ergosterol toxicity.

== Metabolism ==
Ergosterol is converted to brassicasterol in the mammalian liver by DHCR7, the enzyme responsible for producing 7-dehydrocholesterol (provitamin D_{3}) from cholestrol. Here the enzyme catalyzes a reaction analogous to the reverse of provitamin D_{3} production.

Ergosterol added to a high-fat, high-sugar (HFHS) rat diet at a very high concentration of 1% increases the blood levels of vitamin D_{2} by about 4 ng/mL, suggesting that ergosterol that enters the mammalian skin is converted to D_{2} when exposed to light. This same treatment approximately quartered the serum levels of D_{3} and halfed the serum levels of 25-OH D_{3}. At this dose ergosterol has a significant effect on sterol metabolism. It fully normalizes blood markers related to bile acid metabolism to control levels compared to the group only fed the HFHS diet. It displayed significant (but insufficient to match control) normalization of LDL-C and TBA levels.

== See also ==
- Mushrooms and vitamin D
