= Vitamin =

Nutrients required by organisms in small amounts

- Drug class
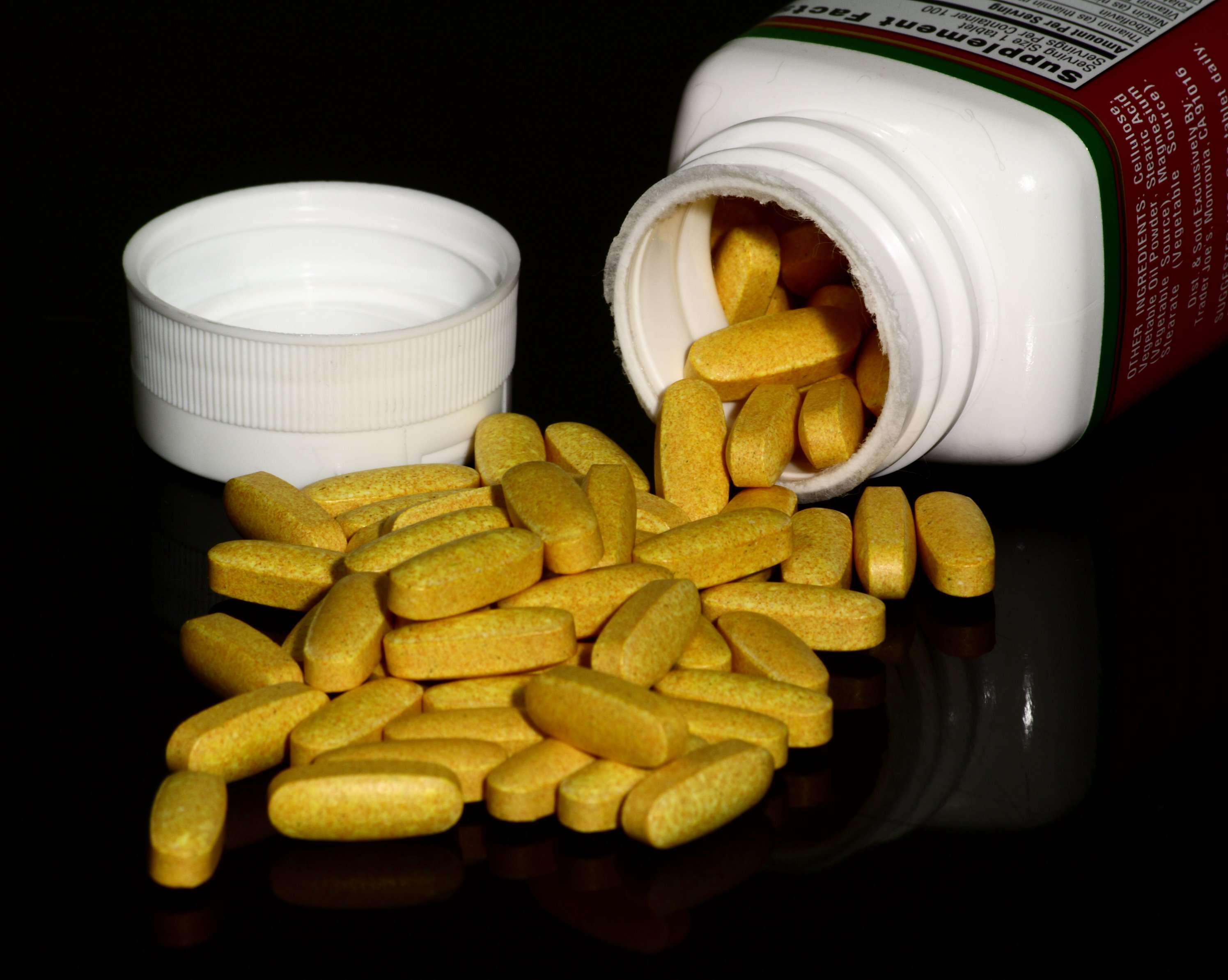
- A bottle of B-complex vitamin pills
- Pronunciation: UK: /ˈvɪtəmɪn, ˈvaɪt-/ VIT-ə-min, VYTE-, US: /ˈvaɪtəmɪn/ VY-tə-min

Legal status

Vitamins are organic molecules (or a set of closely related molecules called vitamers) that are essential to an organism in small quantities for proper metabolic function. These essential nutrients cannot be synthesized in the organism in sufficient quantities for survival, and therefore must be obtained through consumption. For example, vitamin C can be synthesized by some species but not by others; it is not considered a vitamin in the first instance but is in the second. Most vitamins are not single molecules, but groups of related molecules called vitamers. For example, there are eight vitamers of vitamin E: four tocopherols and four tocotrienols.

The other essential nutrients are minerals, essential fatty acids, essential amino acids, and choline.

Major health organizations list thirteen vitamins:

- Vitamin A (all-trans-retinols, all-trans-retinyl-esters, as well as all-trans-β-carotene and other provitamin A carotenoids)
- Vitamin B_{1} (thiamine)
- Vitamin B_{2} (riboflavin)
- Vitamin B_{3} (niacin)
- Vitamin B_{5} (pantothenic acid)
- Vitamin B_{6} (pyridoxine)
- Vitamin B_{7} (biotin)
- Vitamin B_{9} (folic acid and folates)
- Vitamin B_{12} (cobalamins)
- Vitamin C (ascorbic acid and ascorbates)
- Vitamin D (calciferols)
- Vitamin E (tocopherols and tocotrienols)
- Vitamin K (phylloquinones, menaquinones, and menadiones)

Some writers include choline as a vitamin.

Vitamins have diverse biochemical functions. Vitamin A acts as a regulator of cell and tissue growth and differentiation. Vitamin D provides a hormone-like function, regulating mineral metabolism for bones and other organs. The B complex vitamins function as enzyme cofactors (coenzymes) or the precursors for them. Vitamins C and E function as antioxidants. Both deficient and excess intake of a vitamin can potentially cause clinically significant illness. In otherwise healthy people, there is little evidence that vitamin supplementation provides any protection against heart disease or cancer, which are major causes of mortality in older populations.

All the vitamins were discovered between the 1900s and 1930s. Historically, when intake of vitamins from the diet was lacking, the results were vitamin deficiency diseases. Then, starting in 1935, commercially produced tablets of yeast-extract vitamin B complex and semi-synthetic vitamin C became available. This was followed in the 1950s by the mass production and marketing of vitamin supplements, including multivitamins, to prevent vitamin deficiencies in the general population. Governments have mandated the addition of some vitamins to staple foods such as flour or milk, referred to as food fortification, to prevent deficiencies. Recommendations for folic acid supplementation during pregnancy reduced the risk of infant neural tube defects.

== List of vitamins ==
Vitamin		Vitamers	Solubility	U.S. recommended dietary allowances per day (ages 19–70)	Deficiency disease(s)	Overdose syndrome/symptoms	Food sources	References
A		retinol (retinal, retinoic acid, retinoids), carotenoids (alpha-carotene, beta-carotene, gamma-carotene), xanthophyll, beta-cryptoxanthin	fat	900 μg/700 μg	vitamin A deficiency	hypervitaminosis A	fish, liver, dairy products, orange or ripe yellow fruits, leafy vegetables, carrots	
B	B_{1}	thiamine, thiamine monophosphate, thiamine pyrophosphate	water	1.2 mg/1.1 mg	beriberi, Wernicke–Korsakoff syndrome		pork, wholemeal grains, brown rice, vegetables, potatoes	
B	B_{2}	riboflavin, flavin mononucleotide, flavin adenine dinucleotide	water	1.3 mg/1.1 mg	ariboflavinosis		dairy products, meat, liver, refined grains	
B	B_{3}	nicotinic acid, niacinamide, nicotinamide riboside	water	16 mg/14 mg	pellagra	vasodilation, gastrointestinal symptoms, electrolyte imbalances, liver damage	meat, fish, eggs, vegetables, mushrooms, tree nuts	
B	B_{5}	pantothenic acid, panthenol, pantethine	water	5 mg/5 mg	paresthesia	diarrhea	meat, vegetables, seeds, yeast	
B	B_{6}	pyridoxine, pyridoxamine, pyridoxal	water	1.3–1.7 mg/1.2–1.5 mg	anemia, neurological symptoms, dermatitis, cheilosis, glossitis	neuropathy	meat, vegetables, tree nuts, bananas	
B	B_{7}	biotin	water	30 μg/30 μg	biotin deficiency		raw egg yolk, liver, vegetables	
B	B_{9}	folates, folic acid	water	400 μg/400 μg	folate deficiency	may mask symptoms of vitamin B_{12} deficiency	leafy vegetables, legumes, lentils, cereal, liver	
B	B_{12}	cyanocobalamin, hydroxocobalamin, methylcobalamin, adenosylcobalamin	water	2.4 μg/2.4 μg	vitamin B_{12} deficiency anemia		fish, eggs, milk products	
C		ascorbic acid	water	90 mg/75 mg	scurvy	gastrointestinal symptoms	fruits and vegetables, liver	
D	D_{1}	mixture of molecular compounds of ergocalciferol with lumisterol, 1:1	fat	15 μg/15 μg	vitamin D deficiency	hypervitaminosis D		
D	D_{2}	ergocalciferol	fat	15 μg/15 μg	vitamin D deficiency	hypervitaminosis D	Finger millet, mushrooms, seeds, soya bean, Colocasia leaves, yeast	
D	D_{3}	cholecalciferol	fat	15 μg/15 μg	vitamin D deficiency	hypervitaminosis D	fatty fish, fish liver oils, eggs, milk products	
D	D_{4}	22-dihydroergocalciferol	fat	15 μg/15 μg	vitamin D deficiency	hypervitaminosis D		
D	D_{5}	sitocalciferol	fat	15 μg/15 μg	vitamin D deficiency	hypervitaminosis D		
E		tocopherols, tocotrienols	fat	15 mg/15 mg	vitamin E deficiency	bleeding	many fruits and vegetables, nuts, seeds, seed oils	
K	K_{1}	phylloquinone	fat	AI: 110 μg/120 μg	vitamin K deficiency	skin rash, gastrointestinal symptoms	leafy green vegetables	
K	K_{2}	menaquinone	fat	AI: 110 μg/120 μg	vitamin K deficiency	skin rash, gastrointestinal symptoms	poultry and eggs, nattō, beef, pork, or fish	

== History ==
=== Etymology ===
The term "vitamin" was derived from "vitamine", a portmanteau coined from "vital amine" in 1912 by the biochemist Casimir Funk and his friend Max Nierenstein, Reader of Biochemistry at Bristol University, while Funk was working at the Lister Institute of Preventive Medicine. Funk created the name from vital and amine as suggested by Nierenstein, because it appeared that these organic micronutrient food factors that prevent beriberi and perhaps other similar dietary-deficiency diseases were required for life, hence "vital", and were chemical amines, hence "amine", as in the case of thiamine. In 1920, Jack Cecil Drummond proposed that the final "e" be dropped to deemphasize the "amine" reference, hence "vitamin", after researchers began to suspect that not all "vitamines" (in particular, vitamin A) had an amine component. The name "vitamin" soon became synonymous with Hopkins' "accessory factors".

=== Understanding before science ===
The value of eating certain foods to maintain health was recognized long before vitamins were identified in modern science. The ancient Egyptians knew that feeding liver to a person may help with night blindness, an illness now known to be caused by a vitamin A deficiency. The advance of ocean voyages during the Age of Discovery resulted in prolonged periods without access to fresh fruits and vegetables, and made illnesses from vitamin deficiency common among ships' crews.

Year of Discovery, Isolation, Structure determination, Synthesis per vitamin
Discovery	Isolation	Structure Determined	Synthesis	Vitamin
1915	1937	1942	1947	Vitamin A (Retinol)
1906	1926	1932	1933	Vitamin B_{1} (Thiamine)
1907	1926	1932	1933	Vitamin C (Ascorbic acid)
1919	1932	1936	1936	Vitamin D (Calciferol)
1933	1933	1934	1935	Vitamin B_{2} (Riboflavin)
1922	1936	1938	1938	Vitamin E (Tocopherol)
1929	1939	1939	1940	Vitamin K_{1} (Phylloquinone)
1931	1939	1939	1940	Vitamin B_{5} (Pantothenic acid)
1934	1936	1938	1939	Vitamin B_{6} (Pyridoxine)
1926	1939	1942	1943	Vitamin B_{7} (Biotin)
1926	1937	1937	1867	Vitamin B_{3} (Niacin)
1931	1939	1943	1946	Vitamin B_{9} (Folic acid)
1926	1948	1955	1970	Vitamin B_{12} (Cobalamins)

In 1747, the Scottish surgeon James Lind ran a controlled experiment on 12 sailors that showed citrus foods helped prevent scurvy, a particularly deadly disease in which collagen is not properly formed, causing poor wound healing, bleeding of the gums, severe pain, and death; Portuguese and Spanish sailors had independently known about the disease they acquired and how it was reduced after eating oranges and vegetables such as yams and turnips. In 1753, Lind published his Treatise on the Scurvy, which recommended using lemons and limes to avoid scurvy, which was adopted by the British Royal Navy. This led to the nickname limey for British sailors. However, during the 19th century, limes grown in the West Indies were substituted for lemons; these were subsequently found to be much lower in vitamin C. As a result, Arctic expeditions continued to be plagued by scurvy and other deficiency diseases. In the early 20th century, when Robert Falcon Scott made his two expeditions to the Antarctic, the prevailing medical theory was that scurvy was caused by "tainted" canned food.

In 1881, Russian medical doctor Nikolai Lunin studied the effects of scurvy at the University of Tartu. He fed mice an artificial mixture of all the separate constituents of milk known at that time, namely the proteins, fats, carbohydrates, and salts. The mice that received only the individual constituents died, while the mice fed by milk itself developed normally. He made a conclusion that "a natural food such as milk must therefore contain, besides these known principal ingredients, small quantities of unknown substances essential to life." However, his conclusions were rejected by his advisor, Gustav von Bunge. A similar result by Cornelis Adrianus Pekelharing appeared in Dutch medical journal Nederlands Tijdschrift voor Geneeskunde in 1905, but it was not widely reported.

In East Asia, where polished white rice was the common staple food of the middle class, beriberi resulting from lack of vitamin B_{1} was endemic. In 1884, Takaki Kanehiro, a British-trained medical doctor of the Imperial Japanese Navy, observed that beriberi was endemic among low-ranking crew who often ate nothing but rice, but not among officers who consumed a Western-style diet. With the support of the Japanese navy, he experimented using crews of two battleships; one crew was fed only white rice, while the other was fed a diet of meat, fish, barley, rice, and beans. The group that ate only white rice documented 161 crew members with beriberi and 25 deaths, while the latter group had only 14 cases of beriberi and no deaths. This convinced Takaki and the Japanese Navy that diet was the cause of beriberi, but they mistakenly believed that sufficient amounts of protein prevented it. That diseases could result from some dietary deficiencies was further investigated by Christiaan Eijkman, who in 1897 discovered that feeding unpolished rice instead of the polished variety to chickens helped to prevent a kind of polyneuritis that was the equivalent of beriberi. The following year, Frederick Hopkins postulated that some foods contained "accessory factors" – in addition to proteins, carbohydrates, fats etc. – that are necessary for the functions of the human body.

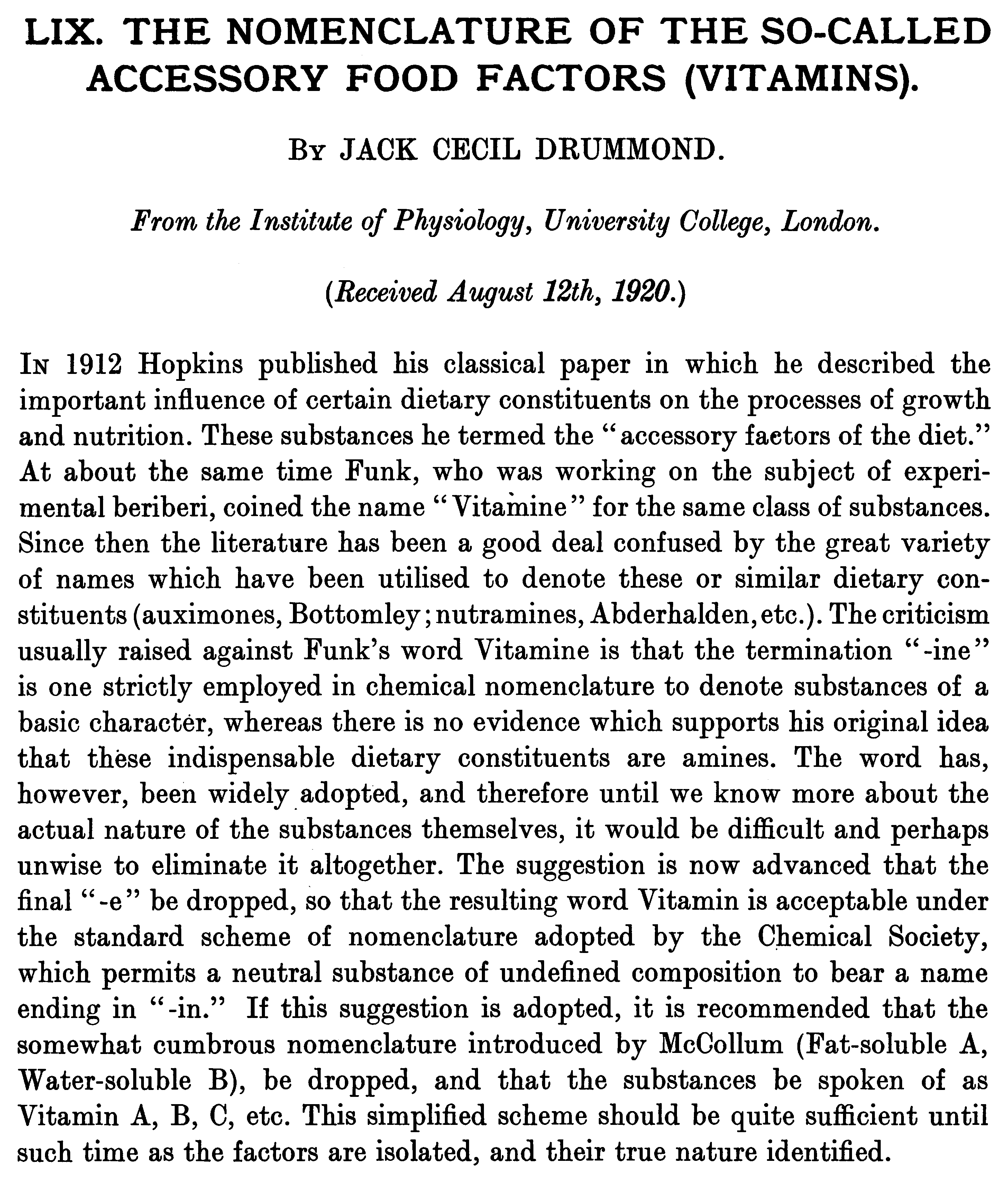
Jack Drummond's single-paragraph article in 1920 which provided structure and nomenclature used today for vitamins

=== Scientific study breakthrough ===
In 1910, the first vitamin complex was isolated by Japanese scientist Umetaro Suzuki, who succeeded in extracting a water-soluble complex of micronutrients from rice bran and named it aberic acid (later Orizanin). He published this discovery in a Japanese scientific journal. When the article was translated into German, the translation failed to state that it was a newly discovered nutrient, a claim made in the original Japanese article, and hence his discovery failed to gain publicity. In 1912 Polish-born biochemist Casimir Funk, working in London, isolated the same complex of micronutrients and proposed the complex be named "vitamine", it was later to be known as vitamin B_{3} (niacin), though he described it as "anti-beri-beri-factor" (which would today be called thiamine or vitamin B_{1}). Funk proposed the hypothesis that other diseases, such as rickets, pellagra, coeliac disease, and scurvy could also be cured by complexes like it.

=== Nobel Prizes for vitamin research ===
The Nobel Prize for Chemistry for 1928 was awarded to Adolf Windaus "for his studies on the constitution of the sterols and their connection with vitamins", the first person to receive an award mentioning vitamins, even though it was not specifically about vitamin D.

The Nobel Prize in Physiology or Medicine for 1929 was awarded to Christiaan Eijkman and Frederick Gowland Hopkins for their contributions to the discovery of vitamins. Thirty-five years earlier, Eijkman had observed that chickens fed polished white rice developed neurological symptoms similar to those observed in military sailors and soldiers fed a rice-based diet, and that the symptoms were reversed when the chickens were switched to whole-grain rice. He called this "the anti-beriberi factor", which was later identified as vitamin B_{1}, thiamine.

In 1930, Paul Karrer elucidated the correct structure for beta-carotene, the main precursor of vitamin A, and identified other carotenoids. Karrer and Norman Haworth confirmed Albert Szent-Györgyi's discovery of ascorbic acid and made significant contributions to the chemistry of flavins, which led to the identification of lactoflavin. For their investigations on carotenoids, flavins and vitamins A and B_{2}, they both received the Nobel Prize in Chemistry in 1937.

In 1931, Albert Szent-Györgyi and a fellow researcher Joseph Svirbely suspected that "hexuronic acid" was actually vitamin C, and gave a sample to Charles Glen King, who proved its ability to counter scurvy in his long-established guinea pig scorbutic assay. In 1937, Szent-Györgyi was awarded the Nobel Prize in Physiology or Medicine for his discovery. In 1943, Edward Adelbert Doisy and Henrik Dam were awarded the Nobel Prize in Physiology or Medicine for their discovery of vitamin K and its chemical structure.

In 1938, Richard Kuhn was awarded the Nobel Prize in Chemistry for his work on carotenoids and vitamins, specifically B_{2} and B_{6}.

Five people have been awarded Nobel Prizes for direct and indirect studies of vitamin B_{12}: George Whipple, George Minot and William P. Murphy (1934), Alexander R. Todd (1957), and Dorothy Hodgkin (1964).

In 1967, George Wald, Ragnar Granit and Haldan Keffer Hartline were awarded the Nobel Prize in Physiology and Medicine "...for their discoveries concerning the primary physiological and chemical visual processes in the eye." Wald's contribution was discovering the role vitamin A had in the process.

=== History of promotional marketing ===
Once discovered, vitamins were actively promoted in articles and advertisements in McCall's, Good Housekeeping, and other media outlets. Marketers enthusiastically promoted cod-liver oil, a source of vitamin D, as "bottled sunshine", and bananas as a "natural vitality food". They promoted foods such as yeast cakes, a source of B vitamins, on the basis of scientifically determined nutritional value, rather than taste or appearance. In 1942, when flour enrichment with nicotinic acid began, a headline in the popular press said "Tobacco in Your Bread." In response, the Council on Foods and Nutrition of the American Medical Association approved of the Food and Nutrition Board's new names niacin and niacin amide for use primarily by non-scientists. It was thought appropriate to choose a name to dissociate nicotinic acid from nicotine, to avoid the perception that vitamins or niacin-rich food contains nicotine, or that cigarettes contain vitamins. The resulting name niacin was derived from nicotinic acid + vitamin. Researchers also focused on the need to ensure adequate nutrition, especially to compensate for what was lost in the manufacture of processed foods.

Robert W. Yoder is credited with first using the term vitamania, in 1942, to describe the appeal of relying on nutritional supplements rather than on obtaining vitamins from a varied diet of foods. The continuing preoccupation with a healthy lifestyle led to an obsessive consumption of vitamins and multi-vitamins, the beneficial effects of which are questionable. As one example, in the 1950s, the Wonder Bread company sponsored the Howdy Doody television show, with host Buffalo Bob Smith telling the audience, "Wonder Bread builds strong bodies 8 ways", referring to the number of added nutrients.

== Classification ==
Vitamins are classified as either water-soluble or fat-soluble. In humans there are 13 vitamins: 4 fat-soluble (A, D, E, and K) and 9 water-soluble (8 B vitamins and vitamin C). Water-soluble vitamins dissolve easily in water and, in general, are readily excreted from the body, to the degree that urinary output is a strong predictor of vitamin consumption. Fat-soluble vitamins are absorbed through the gastrointestinal tract with the help of lipids (fats). Vitamins A and D can accumulate in the body, which can result in dangerous hypervitaminosis. Fat-soluble vitamin deficiency due to malabsorption is of particular significance in cystic fibrosis.

== Anti-vitamins ==
Anti-vitamins are chemical compounds that inhibit the absorption or actions of vitamins. For example, avidin is a protein in raw egg whites that inhibits the absorption of biotin; it is deactivated by cooking. Pyrithiamine, a synthetic compound, has a molecular structure similar to thiamine, vitamin B_{1}, and inhibits the enzymes that use thiamine.

== Biochemical functions ==
Each vitamin is typically used in multiple reactions, and therefore most have multiple functions.

=== On fetal growth and childhood development ===
Vitamins are essential for the normal growth and development of a multicellular organism. Using the genetic blueprint inherited from its parents, a fetus develops from the nutrients it absorbs. It requires certain vitamins and minerals to be present at certain times. These nutrients facilitate the chemical reactions that produce among other things, skin, bone, and muscle. If there is serious deficiency in one or more of these nutrients, a child may develop a deficiency disease. Even minor deficiencies may cause permanent damage.

=== On adult health maintenance ===
Once growth and development are completed, vitamins remain essential nutrients for the healthy maintenance of the cells, tissues, and organs that make up a multicellular organism; they also enable a multicellular life form to efficiently use chemical energy provided by food it eats, and to help process the proteins, carbohydrates, and fats required for cellular respiration.

== Intake ==
=== Sources ===
For the most part, vitamins are obtained from the diet, but some are acquired by other means: for example, microorganisms in the gut flora produce vitamin K and biotin; and one form of vitamin D is synthesized in skin cells when they are exposed to a certain wavelength of ultraviolet light present in sunlight. Humans can produce some vitamins from precursors they consume: for example, vitamin A is synthesized from beta carotene; and niacin is synthesized from the amino acid tryptophan. Vitamin C can be synthesized by some species but not by others. Vitamin B_{12} is the only vitamin or nutrient not available from plant sources. The Food Fortification Initiative lists countries which have mandatory fortification programs for vitamins folic acid, niacin, vitamin A and vitamins B_{1}, B_{2} and B_{12}.

=== Deficient intake ===
The body's stores for different vitamins vary widely; vitamins A, D, and B_{12} are stored in significant amounts, mainly in the liver, and an adult's diet may be deficient in vitamins A and D for many months and B_{12} in some cases for years, before developing a deficiency condition. However, vitamin B_{3} (niacin and niacinamide) is not stored in significant amounts, so stores may last only a couple of weeks. For vitamin C, the first symptoms of scurvy in experimental studies of complete vitamin C deprivation in humans have varied widely, from a month to more than six months, depending on previous dietary history that determined body stores.

Deficiencies of vitamins are classified as either primary or secondary. A primary deficiency occurs when an organism does not get enough of the vitamin in its food. A secondary deficiency may be due to an underlying disorder that prevents or limits the absorption or use of the vitamin, due to a "lifestyle factor", such as smoking, excessive alcohol consumption, or the use of medications that interfere with the absorption or use of the vitamin. People who eat a varied diet are unlikely to develop a severe primary vitamin deficiency, but may be consuming less than the recommended amounts; a national food and supplement survey conducted in the US over 2003–2006 reported that over 90% of individuals who did not consume vitamin supplements were found to have inadequate levels of some of the essential vitamins, notably vitamins D and E.

Well-researched human vitamin deficiencies involve thiamine (beriberi), niacin (pellagra), vitamin C (scurvy), folate (neural tube defects) and vitamin D (rickets). In much of the developed world these deficiencies are rare due to an adequate supply of food and the addition of vitamins to common foods. In addition to these classical vitamin deficiency diseases, some evidence has also suggested links between vitamin deficiency and a number of different disorders.

=== Excess intake ===
Some vitamins have documented acute or chronic toxicity at larger intakes, which is referred to as hypertoxicity. The European Union and the governments of several countries have established tolerable upper intake levels (ULs) for those vitamins which have documented toxicity (see table). The likelihood of consuming too much of any vitamin from food is remote, but excessive intake (vitamin poisoning) from dietary supplements does occur. In 2016, overdose exposure to all formulations of vitamins and multi-vitamin/mineral formulations was reported by 63,931 individuals to the American Association of Poison Control Centers with 72% of these exposures in children under the age of five. In the US, analysis of a national diet and supplement survey reported that about 7% of adult supplement users exceeded the UL for folate and 5% of those older than age 50 years exceeded the UL for vitamin A.

=== Effects of cooking ===
The USDA has conducted extensive studies on the percentage losses of various nutrients from food types and cooking methods. Some vitamins may become more "bio-available" – that is, usable by the body – when foods are cooked. The table below shows whether various vitamins are susceptible to loss from heat—such as heat from boiling, steaming, frying, etc. The effect of cutting vegetables can be seen from exposure to air and light. Water-soluble vitamins such as B and C dissolve into the water when a vegetable is boiled, and are then lost when the water is discarded.

Vitamin	Is substance susceptible to losses under given condition?			
Vitamin	Soluble in Water	Air Exposure	Light Exposure	Heat Exposure
Vitamin A	no	partially	partially	relatively stable
Vitamin C	very unstable	yes	no	no
Vitamin D	no	no	no	no
Vitamin E	no	yes	yes	no
Vitamin K	no	no	yes	no
Thiamine (B_{1})	highly	no	?	> 100 °C
Riboflavin (B_{2})	slightly	no	in solution	no
Niacin (B_{3})	yes	no	no	no
Pantothenic Acid (B_{5})	quite stable	no	no	yes
Vitamin B_{6}	yes	?	yes	< 160 °C
Biotin (B_{7})	somewhat	?	?	no
Folic Acid (B_{9})	yes	?	when dry	at high temp
Cobalamin (B_{12})	yes	?	yes	no

== Recommended levels ==
In setting human nutrient guidelines, government organizations do not necessarily agree on amounts needed to avoid deficiency or maximum amounts to avoid the risk of toxicity. For example, for vitamin C, recommended intakes range from 40 mg/day in India to 155 mg/day for the European Union. The table below shows U.S. Estimated Average Requirements (EARs) and Recommended Dietary Allowances (RDAs) for vitamins, PRIs for the European Union (same concept as RDAs), followed by what three government organizations deem to be the safe upper intake. RDAs are set higher than EARs to cover people with higher than average needs. Adequate Intakes (AIs) are set when there is not sufficient information to establish EARs and RDAs. Governments are slow to revise information of this nature. For the U.S. values, with the exception of calcium and vitamin D, all of the data date to 1997–2004.

All values are consumption per day:

Nutrient	U.S. EAR	Highest U.S. RDA or AI	Highest EU PRI or AI	Upper limit (UL)			Unit
Nutrient	U.S. EAR	Highest U.S. RDA or AI	Highest EU PRI or AI	U.S.	EU	Japan	Unit
Vitamin A	625	900	1300	3000	3000	2700	μg
Vitamin C	75	90	155	2000	ND	ND	mg
Vitamin D	10	15	15	100	100	100	μg
Vitamin K	NE	120	70	ND	ND	ND	μg
α-tocopherol (Vitamin E)	12	15	13	1000	300	650–900	mg
Thiamin (Vitamin B_{1})	1.0	1.2	0.1 mg/MJ	ND	ND	ND	mg
Riboflavin (Vitamin B_{2})	1.1	1.3	2.0	ND	ND	ND	mg
Niacin (Vitamin B_{3})	12	16	1.6 mg/MJ	35	10	60–85	mg
Pantothenic acid (Vitamin B_{5})	NE	5	7	ND	ND	ND	mg
Vitamin B_{6}	1.1	1.3	1.8	100	25	40–60	mg
Biotin (Vitamin B_{7})	NE	30	45	ND	ND	ND	μg
Folate (Vitamin B_{9})	320	400	600	1000	1000	900–1000	μg
Cyanocobalamin (Vitamin B_{12})	2.0	2.4	5.0	ND	ND	ND	μg

EAR US Estimated Average Requirements.

RDA US Recommended Dietary Allowances; higher for adults than for children, and may be even higher for women who are pregnant or lactating.

AI US and EFSA Adequate Intake; AIs established when there is not sufficient information to set EARs and RDAs.

PRI Population Reference Intake is European Union equivalent of RDA; higher for adults than for children, and may be even higher for women who are pregnant or lactating. For Thiamin and Niacin the PRIs are expressed as amounts per MJ of calories consumed. MJ = megajoule = 239 food calories.

UL or Upper Limit Tolerable upper intake levels.

ND ULs have not been determined.

NE EARs have not been established.

== Supplementation ==
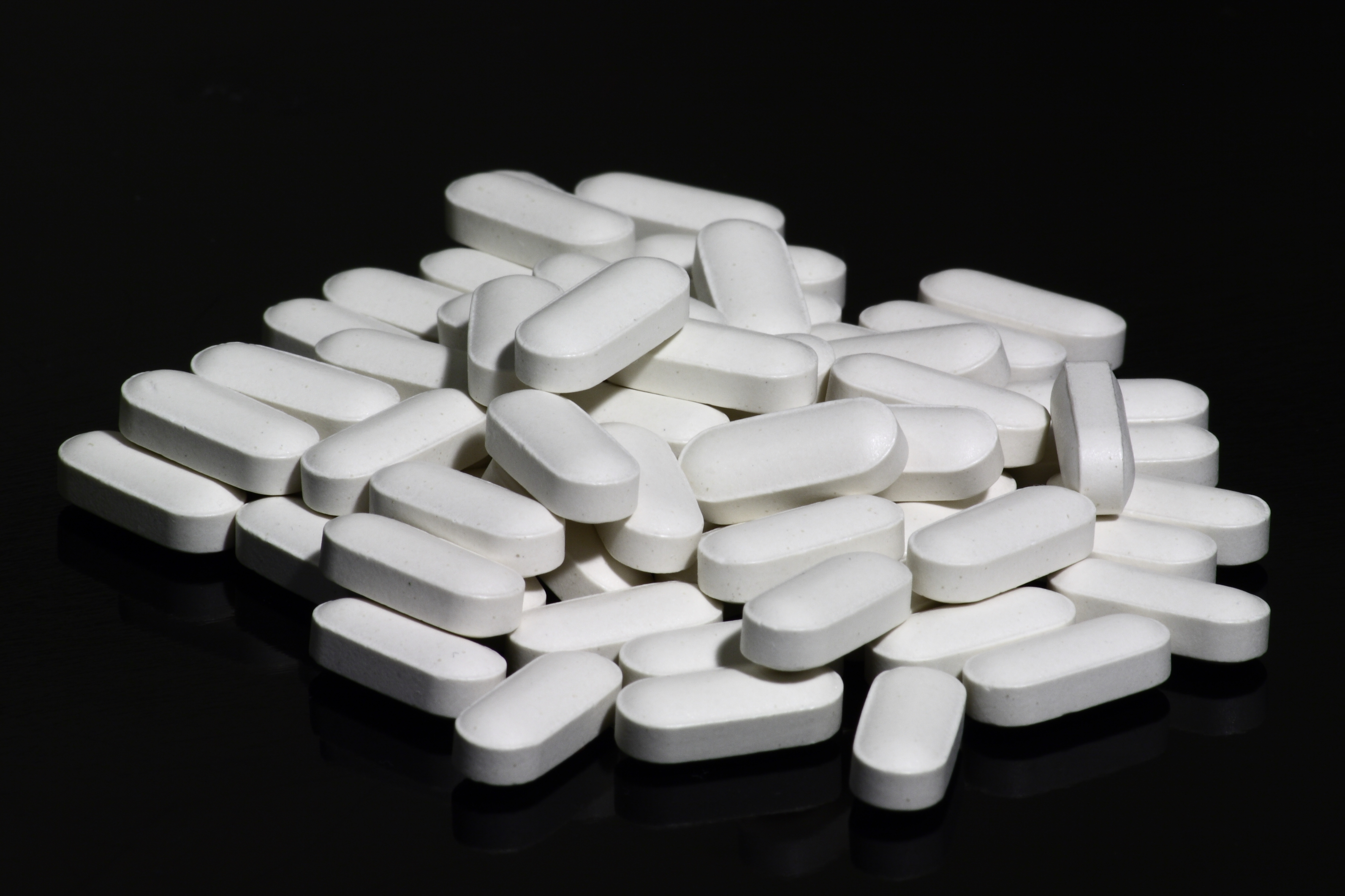
Calcium combined with vitamin D (as calciferol) supplement tablets with fillers.

In those who are otherwise healthy, there is little evidence that supplements have any benefits with respect to cancer or heart disease. Vitamin A and E supplements not only provide no health benefits for generally healthy individuals, but they may increase mortality, though the two large studies that support this conclusion included smokers for whom it was already known that beta-carotene supplements can be harmful. A 2018 meta-analysis found no evidence that intake of vitamin D or calcium for community-dwelling elderly people reduced bone fractures.

Europe has regulations that define limits of vitamin (and mineral) dosages for their safe use as dietary supplements. Most vitamins that are sold as dietary supplements are not supposed to exceed a maximum daily dosage referred to as the tolerable upper intake level (UL or Upper Limit). Vitamin products above these regulatory limits are not considered supplements and should be registered as prescription or non-prescription (over-the-counter drugs) due to their potential side effects. The European Union, United States and Japan establish ULs.

Dietary supplements often contain vitamins, but may also include other ingredients, such as minerals, herbs, and botanicals. Scientific evidence supports the benefits of dietary supplements for persons with certain health conditions. In some cases, vitamin supplements may have unwanted effects, especially if taken before surgery, with other dietary supplements or medicines, or if the person taking them has certain health conditions.

== Governmental regulation and promotion ==
Most countries place dietary supplements in a special category under the general umbrella of foods, not drugs. As a result, the manufacturer, and not the government, has the responsibility of ensuring that its dietary supplement products are safe before they are marketed. Regulation of supplements varies widely by country.

In the United States, a dietary supplement is defined under the Dietary Supplement Health and Education Act of 1994. There is no FDA approval process for dietary supplements, and no requirement that manufacturers prove the safety or efficacy of supplements introduced before 1994. The Food and Drug Administration must rely on its Adverse Event Reporting System to monitor adverse events that occur with supplements.

In 2007, the US Code of Federal Regulations (CFR) Title 21, part III took effect, regulating Good Manufacturing Practices (GMPs) in the manufacturing, packaging, labeling, or holding operations for dietary supplements. Even though product registration is not required, these regulations mandate production and quality control standards (including testing for identity, purity and adulterations) for dietary supplements. In the United States, the United States Pharmacopeia (USP) sets standards for the most commonly used vitamins and preparations thereof. Likewise, monographs of the European Pharmacopoeia (Ph.Eur.) regulate aspects of identity and purity for vitamins on the European market.

In the European Union, the Food Supplements Directive requires that only those supplements that have been proven safe can be sold without a prescription. For most vitamins, pharmacopoeial standards have been established.

In Nigeria, the National Agency for Food and Drug Administration and Control has issued regulations which govern the supply and contents of vitamins and supplements.

In England, the National Health Service makes free vitamins available for babies and children under 4 through its "Healthy Start" programme, adopted due to concerns that young children, even if feeding well, would not receive an adequate intake of vitamins A and D.

== Naming ==
Nomenclature of reclassified vitamins
Previous name	Chemical name	Reason for name change
Vitamin B_{4}	Adenine	DNA metabolite; synthesized in body
Vitamin B_{8}	Adenylic acid	DNA metabolite; synthesized in body
Vitamin B_{T}	Carnitine	Synthesized in body
Vitamin F	Essential fatty acids	Needed in large quantities (does not fit the definition of a vitamin).
Vitamin G	Riboflavin	Reclassified as Vitamin B_{2}
Vitamin H	Biotin	Reclassified as Vitamin B_{7}
Vitamin J	Catechol, Flavin	Catechol nonessential; flavin (specifically riboflavin) reclassified as Vitamin B_{2}
Vitamin L_{1}	Anthranilic acid	Nonessential
Vitamin L_{2}	5′-Methylthioadenosine	RNA metabolite; synthesized in body
Vitamin M or B_{c}	Folate	Reclassified as Vitamin B_{9}
Vitamin P	Flavonoids	Many compounds, not proven essential
Vitamin PP	Niacin	Reclassified as Vitamin B_{3}
Vitamin S	Salicylic acid	Nonessential
Vitamin U	S-Methylmethionine	Protein metabolite; synthesized in body

The reason that the set of vitamins skips directly from E to K is that the vitamins corresponding to letters F–J were either reclassified over time, discarded as false leads, or renamed because of their relationship to vitamin B, which became a complex of vitamins.

The Danish-speaking scientists who isolated and described vitamin K (in addition to naming it as such) did so because the vitamin is intimately involved in the coagulation of blood following wounding (from the Danish word Koagulation). At the time, most (but not all) of the letters from F through to J were already designated, so the use of the letter K was considered quite reasonable. The table Nomenclature of reclassified vitamins lists chemicals that had previously been classified as vitamins, as well as the earlier names of vitamins that later became part of the B-complex.

The missing numbered B vitamins were reclassified or determined not to be vitamins. For example, B_{9} is folic acid and five of the folates are in the range B_{11} through B_{16}. Others, such as PABA (formerly B_{10}), are biologically inactive, toxic, or with unclassifiable effects in humans, or not generally recognised as vitamins by science, such as the highest-numbered, which some naturopath practitioners call B_{21} and B_{22}. There are also lettered B substances (e.g., B_{m}) listed at B vitamins that are not recognized as vitamins. There are other "D vitamins" now recognised as other substances, which some sources of the same type number up to D_{7}. The controversial cancer treatment laetrile was at one point lettered as vitamin B_{17}. There appears to be no consensus on the existence of substances that may have at one time been named as vitamins Q, R, T, V, W, X, Y or Z.

"Vitamin N" is a term popularized for the mental health benefits of spending time in nature settings. "Vitamin I" is slang among athletes for frequent/daily consumption of ibuprofen as a pain-relieving treatment.

== See also ==
- Vitamin deficiency
- Hypervitaminosis
- Human nutrition
