= C20H28O =

The molecular formula C_{20}H_{28}O (molar mass: 284.436 g/mol) may refer to:

- Cingestol
- Delanterone, a steroidal antiandrogen
- Lynestrenol, a progestogen hormone
- Retinal, one of the three forms of vitamin A
- Tigestol
- Vitamin_A2
