= Ethynylestrenol =

Ethynylestrenol, or ethinylestrenol, may refer to:

- Cingestol (17α-ethynyl-5-estren-17β-ol)
- Lynestrenol (17α-ethynyl-4-estren-17β-ol)
- Tigestol (17α-ethynyl-5(10)-estren-17β-ol)
