= Niacin (disambiguation) =

Niacin refers to the vitamers of vitamin B_{3}. Allegedly, it was coined as a portmanteau of "nicotinic acid vitamin" so that nicotinic acid, one of the vitamers of vitamin B_{3}, would not be confused with nicotine.

Niacin may also refer to:

- Niacin (band), with Billy Sheehan
