= C28H46O =

The molecular formula C_{28}H_{46}O (molar mass: 398.66 g/mol) may refer to:

- Brassicasterol
- Dihydrotachysterol
- 22-Dihydroergocalciferol
- 24-methylenecholesterol
- Episterol
- Fecosterol
