= C27H44O =

The molecular formula C_{27}H_{44}O (molar mass: 384.63 g/mol, exact mass: 384.339216 u) may refer to:

- Cholecalciferol
- 7-Dehydrocholesterol
- Desmosterol
- Previtamin D3
- Zymosterol, a cholesterol intermediate
