= Vitamer =

Chemical compound acting as a vitamin

A vitamer (/ˈvaɪtəmər/) is any form in which some vitamin occurs. Each vitamer of a particular vitamin is a compound that performs the functions of that vitamin and prevents the symptoms of deficiency of the vitamin.

Early research identified vitamins by their ability to cure vitamin-specific deficiency diseases. For example, vitamin B_{1} was first identified as a substance that prevented and treated beriberi. Subsequent nutrition research has revealed that all vitamers exhibit biological activity against their specific vitamin deficiency, although different vitamers exhibit different potencies against those diseases.

A set of vitamers with related biological activity are grouped together by a general name, or generic descriptor, that refers to similar compounds with the same vitamin function. For example, vitamin A is the generic descriptor for the class of vitamin A vitamers which includes retinol, retinal, retinoic acid, and provitamin carotenoids such as beta-carotene, among others.

== Properties ==
Vitamers often have subtly different properties from their primary, or most common form. These differences include abundance in the typical diet, bioavailability, toxicity, physiological activities, and metabolism. Some vitamers are associated with different benefits for health compared to other forms of the same vitamin.

Folic acid, a vitamer of vitamin B_{9} commonly added to fortified foods and dietary supplements, is 0.7–1.0 times more bioavailable than vitamers of vitamin B_{9} found in minimally processed foods. Differences in digestion and absorption account for the notable differences in bioavailability between vitamers of vitamin B_{9}. Forms of vitamin B_{9} that occur in minimally processed foods, sometimes referred to as "food folates", require digestion by enzymatic hydrolysis prior to absorption whereas folic acid does not.

Some vitamins have toxic effects when consumed in excess amounts and certain vitamers have a greater potential for toxicity compared to other forms of the same vitamin. For example, hypervitaminosis A is a toxicity syndrome caused by excess consumption of retinoid vitamers of vitamin A such as retinol, retinal, and retinoic acid. In contrast, provitamin A carotenoids such as beta-carotene are not associated with these toxic effects.

Nicotinic acid and nicotinamide are two vitamers of vitamin B_{3} that exhibit differences in metabolism. Large, pharmaceutical doses of the nicotinic acid are used under medical supervision as a treatment for hypercholesterolemia. High doses of nicotinic acid are also associated with a potential for adverse effects, most commonly a niacin flush reaction that is characterized by redness or flushing of the skin, sensations of heat, itching, and tingling. The nicotinamide vitamer of vitamin B_{3} does not exhibit the same therapeutic effect for treatment of hypercholesterolemia, but also does not cause a niacin flush reaction and is not associated with the same adverse effects as nicotinic acid.

== Foods and dietary supplements ==
As part of an overall diet, minimally processed foods provide a number of different naturally occurring vitamers. This is frequently in contrast to fortified foods and dietary supplements which generally provide vitamins as a single vitamer. Vitamin E, vitamin B_{6}, and vitamin B_{9} are three examples.

=== Vitamin E ===
Naturally occurring vitamers of vitamin E include tocopherols (α-, β-, γ-, and δ-) and tocotrienols ( α-, β-, γ-, and δ-). Many plant-based foods provide all eight naturally occurring vitamers of vitamin E in varying amounts from different sources. Tocopherols are more abundant in commonly consumed foods relative to tocotrienols. Fortified foods and dietary supplements predominantly contain vitamin E as α-tocopherol salts, most frequently as tocopheryl acetate or vitamin E acetate.

The different naturally occurring vitamers of vitamin E are not interconverted in the body and have different metabolic effects. Newly absorbed vitamers of vitamin E are transported to the liver. The liver recognizes and preferentially re-secretes α-tocopherol into circulation, making it the most abundant vitamer of vitamin E in the blood. While tocotrienols are present in lower concentrations, they have more potent antioxidant properties than α-tocopherol and can have metabolic impacts at low concentration. Normal serum concentrations of α-tocopherol in adults ranges from 5 to 20 μg/mL.

=== Vitamin B_{6} ===
There are at least six naturally occurring vitamers of vitamin B_{6} including pyridoxine, pyridoxal, and pyridoxamine as well as a 5'-phosphate derivative of each. All six naturally occurring vitamers of vitamin B_{6} are found in foods.

Pyridoxine, along with its phosphorylated form, pyridoxine-5'-phosphate, are primarily found in plant-based foods. Pyridoxine is the most stable vitamer of vitamin B_{6}. Pyridoxine glucoside is a related vitamer that is also found in some plant-based foods. Pyridoxal-5'-phosphate and pyridoxamine-5'-phosphate are vitamers predominantly found in animal-based foods.

Fortified foods and dietary supplements commonly provide vitamin B_{6} as pyridoxine hydrochloride.

=== Vitamin B_{9} (Folate) ===
There are many naturally occurring vitamers of vitamin B_{9}, i.e., folate, found in minimally processed foods. Sometimes referred to as "food folates", these vitamers are characterized as pteroylpolyglutamates and contain between one and six additional glutamate molecules compared to folic acid. Folic acid, chemically described as pteroylmonoglutamic acid, is another vitamer of vitamin B_{9}. Though rarely found in minimally processed foods, it is the primary form of vitamin B_{9} added to fortified foods and many dietary supplements.

Folic acid and food folates are absorbed and metabolized by different pathways. After digestion, food folates are converted in the small intestine to 5-methyltetrahydrofolic acid, a biologically active vitamer of vitamin B_{9}. Folic acid is absorbed and transported in the bloodstream to the liver, where it is converted to tetrahydrofolate, a second biologically active vitamer, by dihydrofolate reductase. The liver has a limited capacity to metabolize folic acid into tetrahydrofolate. Any folic acid that is not converted to tetrahydrofolate in the liver remains in the blood until it is either metabolized in the liver or excreted by the kidney. Folic acid that remains in the blood stream is considered unmetabolized folic acid. Since the introduction of mandatory folic acid fortification in the US, most people have a variable amount of unmetabolized folic acid circulating in their blood.

== List of vitamins with some of their active forms ==
Vitamin generic descriptor name	Vitamer chemical name(s) or chemical class of compounds (list not complete)
Vitamin A	all-trans-Retinol, retinal, retinoic acid, retinoids and the provitamin A carotenoids alpha-carotene, beta-carotene, gamma-carotene; and the xanthophyll beta-cryptoxanthin
Vitamin B_{1}	Thiamine, thiamine monophosphate, thiamine pyrophosphate
Vitamin B_{2}	Riboflavin, flavin mononucleotide (FMN), flavin adenine dinucleotide (FAD)
Vitamin B_{3}	Nicotinic acid, niacinamide, nicotinamide riboside
Vitamin B_{5}	Pantothenic acid, panthenol, pantethine
Vitamin B_{6}	Pyridoxine, pyridoxine phosphate, pyridoxamine, pyridoxamine phosphate, pyridoxal, pyridoxal 5-phosphate
Vitamin B_{7}	Biotin
Vitamin B_{9}	Folic acid (pteroylmononoglutamic acid), folinic acid, 5-methyltetrahydrofolate
Vitamin B_{12}	Cyanocobalamin, hydroxocobalamin, methylcobalamin, adenosylcobalamin
Vitamin C	Ascorbic acid, dehydroascorbic acid, calcium ascorbate, sodium ascorbate, other salts of ascorbic acid
Vitamin D	Calcitriol, ergocalciferol (D_{2}), cholecalciferol (D_{3})
Vitamin E	Tocopherols (d-alpha, d-beta, d-gamma, and d-delta-tocopherol), tocotrienols (alpha, beta, gamma, delta tocotrienols)
Vitamin K	Phylloquinone(K_{1}), menaquinones (K_{2}), menadiones (K_{3})

== See also ==
- Isomer
- Provitamin
