= CYP27 family =

Cytochrome P450, family 27, also known as CYP27, is a Deuterostome cytochrome P450 monooxygenase family found in human genome. This family belongs to Mitochondrial clan CYPs, which is located in the inner membrane of mitochondria (IMM). There are three members in the human genome, CYP27A1, CYP27B1 and CYP27C1, and an ortholog CYP27F1 in sea urchins, Strongylocentrotus purpuratus.
