= Retinene =

Chemical structure of retinene_{1} (retinal)

The retinenes (retinene_{1} and retinene_{2}) are chemical derivatives of vitamin A (see retinol) formed through oxidation reactions.

Retinene_{1} is better known as retinal and is fundamental in the transduction of light into visual signals in the photoreceptor level of the retina (known as the visual cycle). Retinene_{2} is more formally known as dehydroretinal.

The energy of impinging photons will convert retinaldehyde from an 11-cis isomer into an all-trans form. In the retina, this conversion induces a conformational change in the surrounding opsin protein pigment, leading to signaling through the G protein transducin. Retinaldehyde also forms a part of bacteriorhodopsin, a light-induced proton pump found in some archaea.

Experimentally, it is possible to replace 11-cis retinaldehyde by perfusing retinal tissue preparations with retinaldehyde derivatives. Selective modification of the retinaldehyde structure, particularly the density of electrons in the π-orbitals, can lead to insights into the interaction between the retinaldehyde moiety and the surrounding pigment protein.

"The names of all these molecules have recently been changed ... vitamin A is now retinol, retinene is retinal; there is also retinoic acid"—George Wald (1967).

== See also ==
- Retinal
- Visual cycle
