= Dehydroretinal =

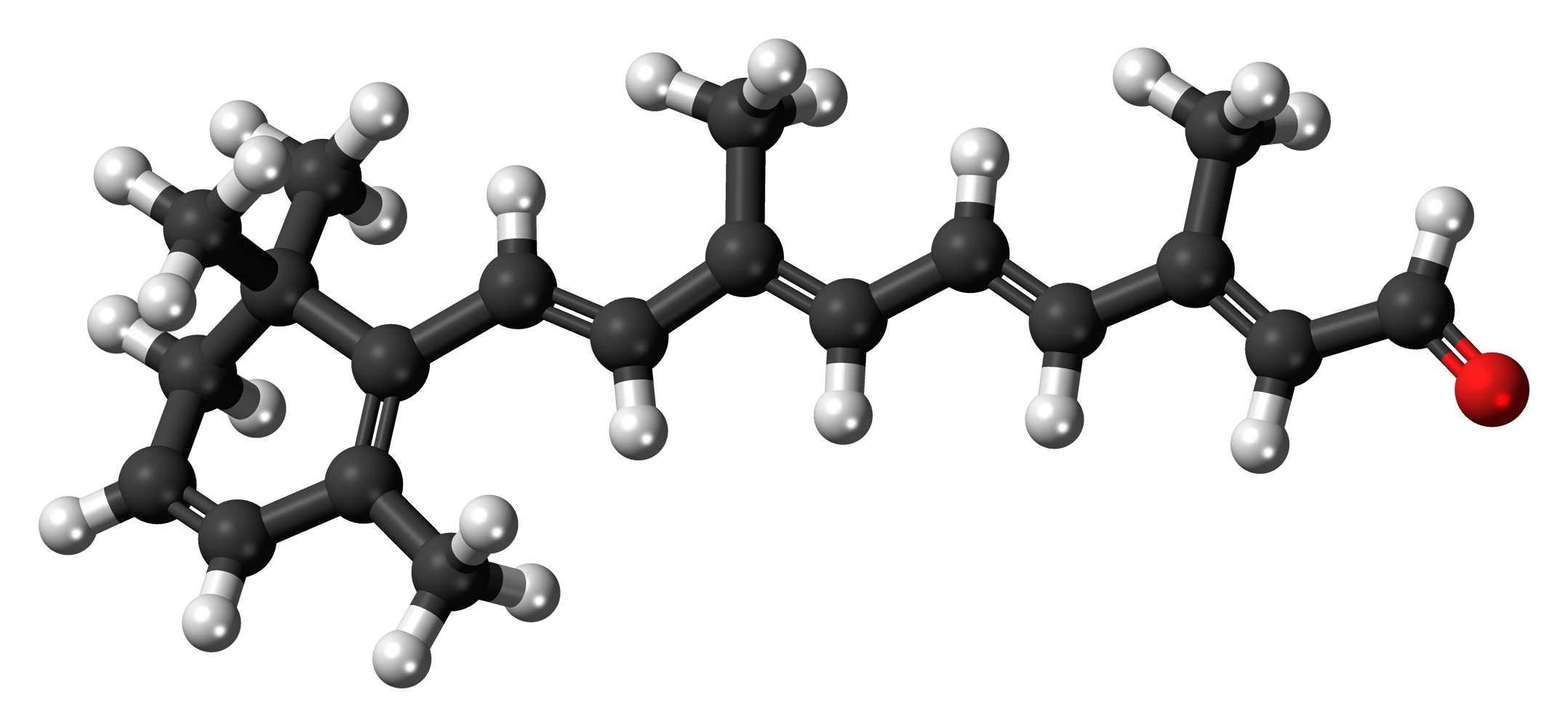

Names
- IUPAC name 3,4-Didehydroretinal
- Systematic IUPAC name (2E,4E,6E,8E)-3,7-Dimethyl-9-(2,6,6-trimethylcyclohexa-1,3-dien-1-yl)nona-2,4,6,8-tetraenal
- Other names 3,4-Dehydroretinal; 3,4-Didehydroretinaldehyde

Identifiers
CAS Number	472-87-7
3D model (JSmol)	Interactive image
ChEBI	CHEBI:28537
ChemSpider	4444397
ECHA InfoCard	100.006.781
EC Number	207-457-7
KEGG	C05918
MeSH	Dehydroretinal
PubChem CID	5280866
UNII	HV8T003XO1
CompTox Dashboard (EPA)	DTXSID30878517
- InChI: InChI=1S/C20H26O/c1-16(8-6-9-17(2)13-15-21)11-12-19-18(3)10-7-14-20(19,4)5/h6-13,15H,14H2,1-5H3/b9-6+,12-11+,16-8+,17-13+ Key: QHNVWXUULMZJKD-OVSJKPMPSA-N; InChI=1/C20H26O/c1-16(8-6-9-17(2)13-15-21)11-12-19-18(3)10-7-14-20(19,4)5/h6-13,15H,14H2,1-5H3/b9-6+,12-11+,16-8+,17-13+ Key: QHNVWXUULMZJKD-OVSJKPMPBA
- SMILES: O=C\C=C(\C=C\C=C(\C=C\C1=C(\C=C/CC1(C)C)C)C)C

Properties
Chemical formula	C_{20}H_{26}O
Molar mass	282.427 g·mol^{−1}
- Except where otherwise noted, data are given for materials in their standard state (at 25 °C [77 °F], 100 kPa). Infobox references

Dehydroretinal (3,4-dehydroretinal) is a derivative metabolite of retinal belonging to the group of vitamin A_{2} as a retinaldehyde form, besides the endogenously present 3,4-dehydroretinol and 3,4-dehydroretinoic acid.

The livers of some freshwater fishes and some fish found in India contain a higher ratio of dehydroretinal to retinal than do other species.

== See also ==
- Retinene
