= 7-Dehydrositosterol =

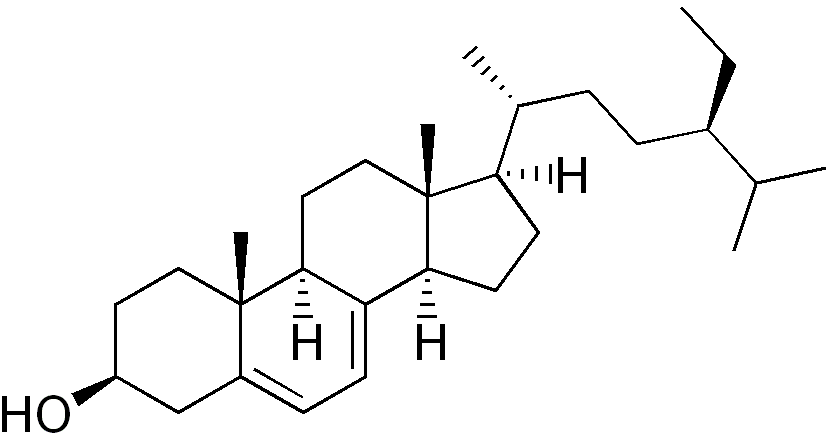

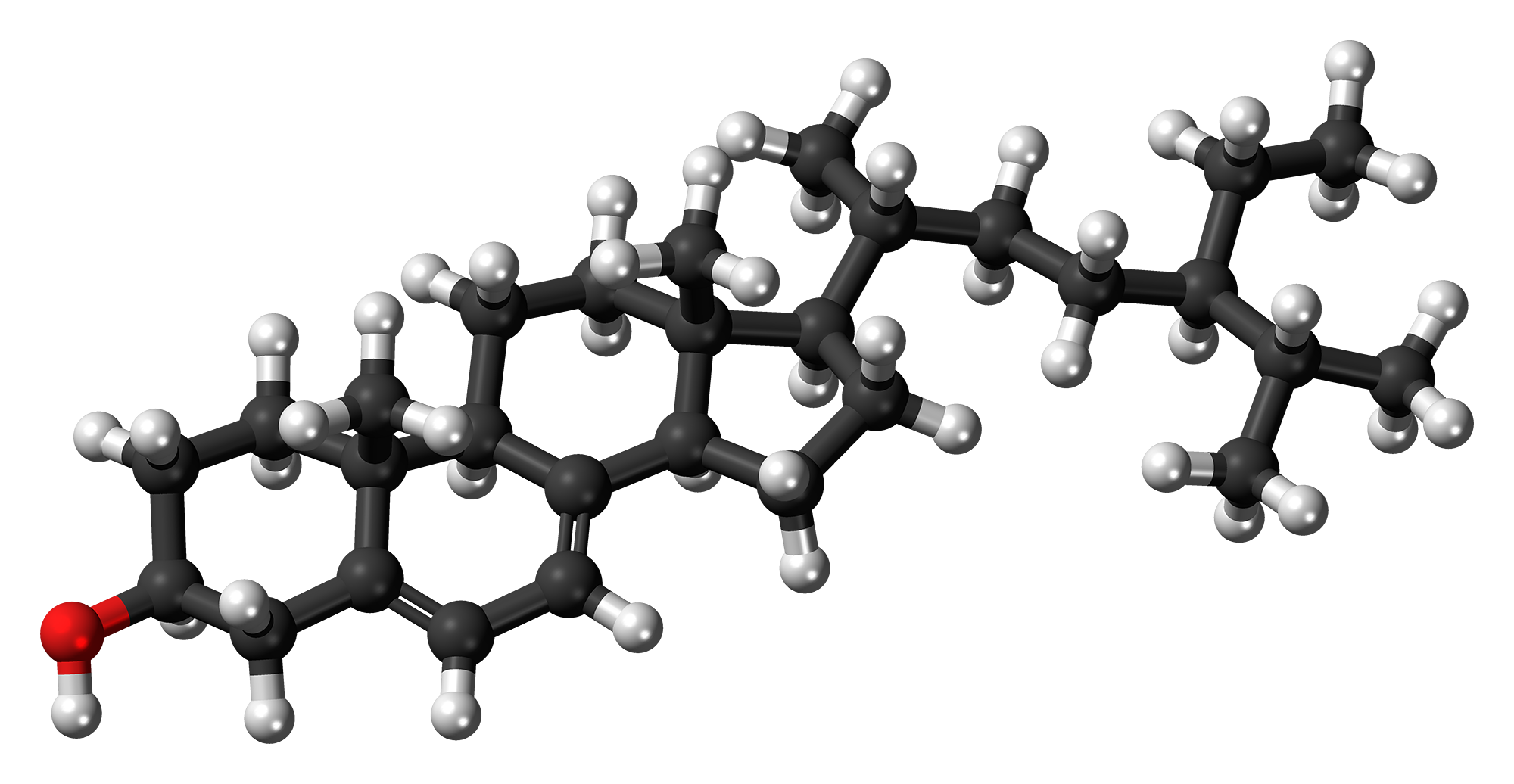

Names
- IUPAC name Stigmasta-5,7-dien-3β-ol
- Systematic IUPAC name (1R,3aR,7S,9aR,9bS,11aR)-1-[(2R,5R)-5-Ethyl-6-methylheptan-2-yl]-9a,11a-dimethyl-2,3,3a,6,7,8,9,9a,9b,10,11,11a-dodecahydro-1H-cyclopenta[a]phenanthren-7-ol

Identifiers
CAS Number	521-04-0
3D model (JSmol)	Interactive image
ChemSpider	4446728
ECHA InfoCard	100.007.547
PubChem CID	101740
UNII	A6478ODO9X
CompTox Dashboard (EPA)	DTXSID50200093
- InChI: InChI=1S/C29H48O/c1-7-21(19(2)3)9-8-20(4)25-12-13-26-24-11-10-22-18-23(30)14-16-28(22,5)27(24)15-17-29(25,26)6/h10-11,19-21,23,25-27,30H,7-9,12-18H2,1-6H3/t20-,21-,23+,25-,26+,27+,28+,29-/m1/s1 Key: ARVGMISWLZPBCH-XHVHEOSNSA-N
- SMILES: O[C@@H]4C/C3=C/C=C1\[C@H](CC[C@]2([C@H]1CC[C@@H]2[C@H](C)CC[C@@H](CC)C(C)C)C)[C@@]3(C)CC4

Properties
Chemical formula	C_{29}H_{48}O
Molar mass	412.691
- Except where otherwise noted, data are given for materials in their standard state (at 25 °C [77 °F], 100 kPa). verify (what is ?) Infobox references

7-Dehydrositosterol is a phytosterol which serves as a precursor for sitocalciferol (vitamin D_{5}). It is naturally made by plants as a precursor of sitosterol.
