= Provitamin =

Substances animals can metabolize into vitamins

A provitamin is a substance that may be converted within the body to a vitamin. The term previtamin is occasionally used as a synonym, though it has its own distinct usage for Vitamin D.

The term "provitamin" is used when it is desirable to label a substance with little or no vitamin activity, but which can be converted to an active form by normal metabolic processes.

== Example ==
Some provitamins are:

- "Provitamin A" is a name for β-carotene, which has only about 1/6 the biological activity of retinol (vitamin A); the body uses an enzyme to convert β-carotene to retinol. In other contexts, both β-carotene and retinol are simply considered to be different forms (vitamers) of vitamin A.
- "Provitamin B5" is a name for panthenol, which may be converted in the body to vitamin B_{5} (pantothenic acid).
- Menadione is a synthetic provitamin of vitamin K.
- Provitamin D_{2} is ergosterol, and provitamin D_{3} is 7-dehydrocholesterol. They are converted by UV light to previtamin D_{2} and previtamin D_{3}, which in turn spontaneously convert to vitamin D_{2} and vitamin D_{3}.

The human body produces provitamin D_{3} naturally; deficiency is usually caused by a lack of sun exposure, not a lack of the provitamin.
