= Vitamin A2 =

Vitamin A_{2} alcohol

Names
- IUPAC name 3,4-Didehydroretinol
- Preferred IUPAC name (2E,4E,6E,8E)-3,7-Dimethyl-9-(2,6,6-trimethylcyclohexa-1,3-dien-1-yl)nona-2,4,6,8-tetraen-1-ol
- Other names Retinol 2; 3,4-Dehydroretinol

Identifiers
CAS Number	79-80-1
3D model (JSmol)	Interactive image
ChEBI	CHEBI:132246
ChEMBL	ChEMBL1797132
ChemSpider	4940721
ECHA InfoCard	100.001.116
EC Number	201-226-4
KEGG	C21797
PubChem CID	6436043
UNII	104621892X
CompTox Dashboard (EPA)	DTXSID401018959
- InChI: InChI=1S/C20H28O/c1-16(8-6-9-17(2)13-15-21)11-12-19-18(3)10-7-14-20(19,4)5/h6-13,21H,14-15H2,1-5H3/b9-6+,12-11+,16-8+,17-13+ Key: XWCYDHJOKKGVHC-OVSJKPMPSA-N
- SMILES: CC1=C(C(CC=C1)(C)C)/C=C/C(=C/C=C/C(=C/CO)/C)/C

Properties
Chemical formula	C_{20}H_{28}O
Molar mass	284.443 g·mol^{−1}
- Except where otherwise noted, data are given for materials in their standard state (at 25 °C [77 °F], 100 kPa). Infobox references

Vitamin A_{2} is a subcategory of vitamin A.

As with all vitamin A forms, A_{2} can exist as an aldehyde, Dehydroretinal (3,4-dehydroretinal), an alcohol, 3,4-dehydroretinol (vitamin A_{2} alcohol) or an acid, 3,4-dehydroretinoic acid (vitamin A_{2} acid). Many cold-blooded vertebrates use the aldehyde for their visual system to obtain a red-shifted sensitive spectrum.

Human skin naturally contains the alcohol form. In humans, CYP27C1 converts ordinary A_{1} (all-trans retinoids) to A_{2}. The enzyme also converts 11-cis-retinal.

Vitamin A_{2} was first identified by Richard Alan Morton using newly-developed absorption spectroscopy in 1941.
