= Tigestol =

Chemical compound

Identifiers
- IUPAC name: (8R,9S,13S,14S,17R)-17-ethynyl-13-methyl-2,3,4,6,7,8,9,11,12,14,15,16-dodecahydro-1H-cyclopenta[a]phenanthren-17-ol
- CAS Number: 896-71-9
- PubChem CID: 13471
- ChemSpider: 12892
- UNII: 1WAE0P123G
- KEGG: D06145
- ChEMBL: ChEMBL2105440
- CompTox Dashboard (EPA): DTXSID501024751

Chemical and physical data
- Formula: C_{20}H_{28}O
- Molar mass: 284.443 g·mol^{−1}
- 3D model (JSmol): Interactive image
- SMILES: CC12CCC3C(C1CCC2(C#C)O)CCC4=C3CCCC4
- InChI: InChI=1S/C20H28O/c1-3-20(21)13-11-18-17-9-8-14-6-4-5-7-15(14)16(17)10-12-19(18,20)2/h1,16-18,21H,4-13H2,2H3/t16-,17-,18+,19+,20+/m1/s1; Key:DHOKBGHAEUVRMO-SLHNCBLASA-N

Tigestol (INN, USAN), also known as 17α-ethynylestr-5(10)-en-17β-ol, is a steroidal progestin of the 19-nortestosterone group that was developed by Organon in the 1960s but was never marketed. It is an isomer of the related 19-nortestosterone derivative progestins lynestrenol and cingestol.
