= 22-Dihydroergocalciferol =

Names
- IUPAC name (3S,5Z,7E)-9,10-Secoergosta-5,7,10(19)-trien-3-ol
- Systematic IUPAC name (1S,3Z)-3-[(2E)-2-{(1R,3aS,7aR)-1-[(2R,5S)-5,6-Dimethylheptan-2-yl]-7a-methyloctahydro-4H-inden-4-ylidene}ethylidene]-4-methylidenecyclohexan-1-ol
- Other names (5Z,7E)-(3S)-9,10-seco-5,7,10(19)-ergostatrien-3-ol (24S)-Methylcalciol; 22,23-Dihydroercalciol; Vitamin D_{4}

Identifiers
| CAS Number | 511-28-4 |
| 3D model (JSmol) | Interactive image |
| ChEBI | CHEBI:33237 |
| ChemSpider | 4574179 |
| ECHA InfoCard | 100.007.389 |
| PubChem CID | 5460703 |
| UNII | KN41X73N6C |
| CompTox Dashboard (EPA) | DTXSID801026994 |
- InChI: InChI=1S/C28H46O/c1-19(2)20(3)9-10-22(5)26-15-16-27-23(8-7-17-28(26,27)6)12-13-24-18-25(29)14-11-21(24)4/h12-13,19-20,22,25-27,29H,4,7-11,14-18H2,1-3,5-6H3/b23-12+,24-13-/t20-,22+,25-,26+,27-,28+/m0/s1 Key: DIPPFEXMRDPFBK-JPWDPSJFSA-N; InChI=1/C28H46O/c1-19(2)20(3)9-10-22(5)26-15-16-27-23(8-7-17-28(26,27)6)12-13-24-18-25(29)14-11-21(24)4/h12-13,19-20,22,25-27,29H,4,7-11,14-18H2,1-3,5-6H3/b23-12+,24-13-/t20-,22+,25-,26+,27-,28+/m0/s1 Key: DIPPFEXMRDPFBK-JPWDPSJFBS
- SMILES: O[C@@H]1CC(\C(=C)CC1)=C\C=C2/CCC[C@]3([C@H]2CC[C@@H]3[C@H](C)CC[C@H](C)C(C)C)C

Properties
| Chemical formula | C_{28}H_{46}O |
| Molar mass | 398.675 g·mol^{−1} |
- Except where otherwise noted, data are given for materials in their standard state (at 25 °C [77 °F], 100 kPa). verify (what is ?) Infobox references

22-Dihydroergocalciferol is a form of vitamin D, also known as vitamin D_{4}. It has the systematic name (5Z,7E)-(3S)-9,10-seco-5,7,10(19)-ergostatrien-3-ol.

Vitamin D_{4} is found in certain mushrooms, being produced from ergosta-5,7-dienol (22,23-dihydroergosterol) instead of ergosterol.

== See also ==
- Forms of vitamin D, the five known forms of vitamin D
- Lumisterol, a constituent of vitamin D_{1}
