= CYP27C1 =

Protein-coding gene in the species Homo sapiens

Identifiers
- Aliases: CYP27C1, cytochrome P450 family 27 subfamily C member 1
- External IDs: GeneCards: CYP27C1
Enzyme activity
EC #	BRENDA	ExPASy	KEGG	MetaCyc
1.14.19.53	↗	↗	↗	↗

Gene location (Human)
Chr.	Chromosome 2 (human)
Band	2q14.3	Start	127,183,832 bp
Band	2q14.3	End	127,220,313 bp
RNA expression pattern
Bgee	Human / Mouse (ortholog); Top expressed in: tendon of biceps brachii; cartilage tissue; synovial membrane; synovial joint; testicle; tibia; ventricular zone; ectocervix; skin of leg; palpebral conjunctiva / n/a; More reference expression data
BioGPS	n/a
Gene ontology
Molecular function	iron ion binding; oxidoreductase activity; heme binding; oxidoreductase activity, acting on paired donors, with incorporation or reduction of molecular oxygen; metal ion binding; monooxygenase activity; retinoic acid binding; 11-cis retinal binding; all-trans retinal binding; all-trans-retinol binding; all-trans retinol 3,4-desaturase activity; all-trans retinal 3,4-desaturase activity; all-trans retinoic acid 3,4-desaturase activity; 11-cis-retinal 3,4-desaturase activity
Cellular component	membrane; cellular component; intracellular membrane-bounded organelle
Biological process	retinol metabolic process; retinoic acid metabolic process; retinal metabolic process
Sources:Amigo / QuickGO
Orthologs
Databases	NCBI: entry; OMA: entry
Species	Human	Mouse
Entrez	339761	n/a
Ensembl	ENSG00000186684	n/a
UniProt	Q4G0S4	n/a
RefSeq (mRNA)	NM_001001665; NM_001367501; NM_001367502	n/a
RefSeq (protein)	NP_001001665; NP_001354430; NP_001354431	n/a
Location (UCSC)	Chr 2: 127.18 – 127.22 Mb	n/a
PubMed search		n/a
- Wikidata
View/Edit Human

CYP27C1 (cytochrome P450, family 27, subfamily C, polypeptide 1) or cytochrome P450 27C1 is a protein that in humans is encoded by the CYP27C1 gene. The Enzyme Commission number (EC) for this protein is EC 1.14.19.53. The full accepted name is all-trans-retinol 3,4-desaturase and the EC number 1 classifies CYP27C1 as a oxidoreductase that acts on paired donor by reducing oxygen. It is also identifiable by the UniProt code Q4G0S4.

This gene encodes a member of the cytochrome P450 superfamily of enzymes. The cytochrome P450 proteins are monooxygenases which catalyze many reactions involved in drug metabolism and synthesis of cholesterol, steroids and other lipids.

The main function of the CYP27C1 enzyme is conversion of vitamin A_{1} (all-trans retinol) to vitamin A_{2} (all-trans 3,4-dehydroretinal).

== Activity ==
The basic reaction for CYP27C1 is as follows:

all-trans-retinol + 2 reduced adrenodoxin + 2 H^{+} + O_{2} = all-trans-3,4-didehydroretinol + 2 oxidized adrenodoxin + 2 H_{2}O.

The initial substrate for this reaction is ordinary retinol, which can come from a number of vitamers all known as vitamin A.

The catalytic efficiency of CYP27C1 was assessed for all trans-retinol, retinal, and retinoic acid, and was highest for retinol, indicating that this enzyme is primed to convert vitamin A_{1} to A_{2}. It does also convert all trans retinal, retinoic acid, and 11-cis retinal.

== Regulation ==
Thyroid hormones (TH) may play a role in inducing this change, as TH receptors have been shown to regulate CYP27C1 within the retinal pigment epithelium. TH nuclear receptors thraa^{-I-}, thrab^{-I-}, and thrb^{-I-} were needed for the successful conversion of vitamin A, however, no one receptor was identified as being absolutely necessary.

== Structure ==
CYP27C1 is predicted to have many alpha helices and to be globular in shape. It is unclear where the active site lies in the protein, but there is a low confidence loop region that would be able to fit a molecule of retinol.

== Function in humans ==
CYP27C1 catalyzes 3,4-desaturation of retinoids, particularly all-trans-retinol (vitamin A_{1}) to all-trans 3,4-dehydroretinal (vitamin A_{2}). The enzyme is unusual among mammalian P450s in that the predominant oxidation is a desaturation and in that hydroxylation represents only a minor pathway - the enzyme catalyzes 3- and 4-hydroxylation as minor events. The enzyme is located in human skin epidermis.

The function of the enzyme was only discovered in 2016. Before that, it was considered an "orphan" enzyme. An orphan enzyme is an enzyme activity that has been experimentally characterized but for which there is no known amino-acid or nucleotide sequence data.

One of the functions in humans also involves negatively regulating lung cancer cell proliferation by means of regulating the IGF-1R/Akt/p53 signaling pathways. Researches found that CYP27C1 knock-downs in mice led to increased tumor cell proliferation, colony formation, and tumor burden. Vinorelbine, a chemotherapy drug used to treat lung cancer, could potentially be a novel substrate for CYP27C1.

== Function in fish ==
Despite being found in human skin, CYP27C1 is also found in other mammals, birds, fish and amphibians. CYP27C1 is responsible for shifting photosensitivity by converting vitamin A_{1} to vitamin A_{2} in the rhodopsin in fish eyes. In zebrafish and lamprey, CYP27C1 is expressed in the retinal pigment epithelium. The replacement of A_{1} by A_{2} broadens the range of the spectral absorption bandwidth and shifts the sensitivity towards red. This conversion also decreases photosensitivity.

In Pacific salmonids in particular, Coho salmon parr shift vitamin A_{1}/A_{2} ratio in their rod visual pigments in accordance with temperature and day length. A_{2} increases during winter and decreases in summer. The increased density of A_{2} in winter may reduce the parr's ability to see and respond to near-infrared light, as occurs in zebrafish, when there is less light availability. The seasonal differences in retinal expression in rods are indicative of plasticity in spectral scope driven by environmental conditions.

Similar shifts in vitamin A_{1} to A_{2} along with increased CYP7C1 expression in juvenile lampreys indicate that red-shifted vision is an ancestrally evolved mechanism that helped fish adapt to different spectral climates during ontogeny. Differences in expression of CYP27C1 in the same species of lamprey in different areas further support that CYP27C1 is used in sensory plasticity and offer insights into the evolutionary history of the function of CYP27C1.

Recently, the gene sequence for CYP27C1 has been isolated, as least in goldfish.This gene is 540 amino acids long in Carassius auratus and has a GenBank reference number of XP-026113677.1. This length is similar to other CYP reductases and is an average length for a protein.

== Popular culture ==
CYP27C1 is the topic of the comic Sherman's lagoon for May 26, 2016. In response to Hawthorne's inquiry about the chemical, Ernest explains that it is an enzyme that enhances ability to see infrared light, allowing fish to see better in murky waters. Ernest can see however that Hawthorne is more interested in how to synthesize it commercially.
