= Lumisterol =

- Lumisterol

Names
- IUPAC name (22E)-9β,10α-Ergosta-5,7,22-trien-3β-ol
- Systematic IUPAC name (1R,3aR,7S,9aS,9bR,11aR)-1-[(2R,3E,5R)-5,6-Dimethylhept-3-en-2-yl]-9a,11a-dimethyl-2,3,3a,6,7,8,9,9a,9b,10,11,11a-dodecahydro-1H-cyclopenta[a]phenanthren-7-ol

Identifiers
CAS Number	474-69-1
3D model (JSmol)	Interactive image
ChemSpider	4941479
ECHA InfoCard	100.006.808
PubChem CID	6436872
UNII	170D11Q82N
CompTox Dashboard (EPA)	DTXSID60878681
- InChI: InChI=1S/C28H44O/c1-18(2)19(3)7-8-20(4)24-11-12-25-23-10-9-21-17-22(29)13-15-27(21,5)26(23)14-16-28(24,25)6/h7-10,18-20,22,24-26,29H,11-17H2,1-6H3/b8-7+/t19-,20+,22-,24+,25-,26+,27+,28+/m0/s1 Key: DNVPQKQSNYMLRS-YAPGYIAOSA-N; InChI=1/C28H44O/c1-18(2)19(3)7-8-20(4)24-11-12-25-23-10-9-21-17-22(29)13-15-27(21,5)26(23)14-16-28(24,25)6/h7-10,18-20,22,24-26,29H,11-17H2,1-6H3/b8-7+/t19-,20+,22-,24+,25-,26+,27+,28+/m0/s1 Key: DNVPQKQSNYMLRS-YAPGYIAOBK
- SMILES: O[C@@H]4C/C3=C/C=C1\[C@@H](CC[C@]2([C@H]1CC[C@@H]2[C@@H](/C=C/[C@H](C)C(C)C)C)C)[C@]3(C)CC4

Properties
Chemical formula	C_{28}H_{44}O
Molar mass	396.659 g·mol^{−1}
- Except where otherwise noted, data are given for materials in their standard state (at 25 °C [77 °F], 100 kPa). verify (what is ?) Infobox references

Lumisterol, more specifically lumisterol_{2} (L_{2}), is a compound that is part of the vitamin D family of steroid compounds. It is the (9β,10α) stereoisomer of ergosterol and occurs as a photochemical by-product in the preparation of vitamin D_{1}, a mixture of vitamin D_{2} and lumisterol. Lumisterol has an analog based on 7-dehydrocholesterol, known as lumisterol 3 or lumisterol_{3} (L_{3}).

== Formation ==
Lumisterol is produced when previtamin D, instead of isomerizing to vitamin D, receives an additional UVB photon to cause a disrotatory electrocyclic ring-closure. In vivo this happens under high-dose or prolonged UVB exposure.

== Reactions ==
Vitamin D_{2} can be formed from L_{2} by an electrocyclic ring opening (back to the previtamin) and subsequent sigmatropic [1,7] hydride shift. This conversion reaction can be stimulated by UV-B or heat. At very high doses in mice, this conversion can occur in the body.

L_{2} is metabolized by CYP27A1, causing hydroxylation at the 24, 27, 28 positions.

L_{3} is processed by CYP27A1 to form products hydroxylated at positions 25 and/or 27. CYP11A1 can 20S-hydroxylate L_{3}. The resulting products are biologically active. Many of these products activate UV-defense mechanisms in keratinocytes.
