= Vitamin D5 =

Fat soluble vitamin

Vitamin D_{5}

Names
- IUPAC name (1S,3Z)-3-[(2E)-2-[(1R,3aS,7aR)-1-[(1R,4S)-4-ethyl-1,5-dimethylhexyl]-7a-methyl-2,3,3a,5,6,7-hexahydro-1H-inden-4-ylidene]ethylidene]-4-methylene-1-cyclohexanol
- Other names Sitocalciferol (5Z,7E)-(3S)-9,10-secoporiferasta-5,7,10(19)-trien-3-ol

Identifiers
CAS Number	71761-06-3
3D model (JSmol)	Interactive image
ChEBI	CHEBI:33279
ChemSpider	7826639
PubChem CID	9909623
UNII	0W2I161LCL
CompTox Dashboard (EPA)	DTXSID301028171
- InChI: InChI=1S/C29H48O/c1-7-23(20(2)3)12-10-22(5)27-16-17-28-24(9-8-18-29(27,28)6)13-14-25-19-26(30)15-11-21(25)4/h13-14,20,22-23,26-28,30H,4,7-12,15-19H2,1-3,5-6H3/b24-13+,25-14-/t22-,23+,26+,27-,28+,29-/m1/s1 Key: RMDJVOZETBHEAR-GHTRHTQZSA-N; InChI=1/C29H48O/c1-7-23(20(2)3)12-10-22(5)27-16-17-28-24(9-8-18-29(27,28)6)13-14-25-19-26(30)15-11-21(25)4/h13-14,20,22-23,26-28,30H,4,7-12,15-19H2,1-3,5-6H3/b24-13+,25-14-/t22-,23+,26+,27-,28+,29-/m1/s1 Key: RMDJVOZETBHEAR-GHTRHTQZBN
- SMILES: O[C@@H]1CC(\C(=C)CC1)=C\C=C2/CCC[C@]3([C@H]2CC[C@@H]3[C@H](C)CC[C@H](CC)C(C)C)C

Properties
Chemical formula	C_{29}H_{48}O
Molar mass	412.702 g·mol^{−1}
- Except where otherwise noted, data are given for materials in their standard state (at 25 °C [77 °F], 100 kPa). verify (what is ?) Infobox references

Vitamin D_{5} (sitocalciferol) is a form of vitamin D. When 7-dehydrositosterol is exposed to UVB light, the result is sitocalciferol, following a photochemical reaction mechanism analogous to that of natural cholecalciferol production. It is naturally found in some plants (7-dehydrositosterol is a phytosterol, which means that it is mostly made by plants).

== 1α-Hydroxyvitamin D_{5} ==
1α-Hydroxyvitamin D_{5} (1α-OH D_{5} or less specifically, 1-OH D_{5}) is a chemical derivative of vitamin D_{5}. It differs from D_{5} by having a hydroxyl group on the number 1 carbon, in the "alpha" chirality.

=== Research ===
Analogs of calcitriol (1α,25-(OH)_{2} D_{3}), have been proposed for use as antitumor agents. Studies on 1α,25-(OH)_{2} D_{3} have shown inhibition of cell proliferation in prostate cancer, but high doses of 1α,25-(OH)_{2} D_{3} result in hypercalcemia. 1α-OH D_{5}, however, does not cause hypercalcemia while inhibiting tumor cell proliferation.

The motive to study 1α-OH D_{5} as a potential pharmaceutical drug stemmed from the tendency of calcitriol, a natural metabolite produced in the kidney, to cause toxic hypercalcemia in patients when dosed at concentrations needed to interrupt prostate cancer cells' cycle and stimulate apoptosis. And while supplementation with dexamethasone decreases hypercalcemia, bypassing it with an equally effective tumor suppressant would reduce patient cost and stress. Thus, the therapeutic effects of 1α-OH D_{5} as a potential antitumor agent without the side effects of calcitriol became a topic of study.

== Synthesis ==
1α-OH D_{5} was first synthesized in 1997 by researchers in the Department of Chemistry at the University of Chicago, under Robert M. Moriarty and Dragos Albinescu. By 2005, the group had revised its synthesis method for a more streamlined, higher yield-producing route. It involved the photochemical conversion of precursor 7-dehydrositosteryl acetate to contain a conjugated triene system, a hallmark of this analog, followed by hydroxylation, photoisomerization, and deprotection steps. Their overall yield was 48%.

== See also ==
- 7-Dehydrositosterol
- Calcipotriene
