= CYP27A1 =

Protein-coding gene in humans

Identifiers
- Aliases: CYP27A1, CP27, CTX, CYP27, cytochrome P450 family 27 subfamily A member 1
- External IDs: OMIM: 606530; MGI: 88594; GeneCards: CYP27A1
Available structures
PDB	Ortholog search: PDBe RCSB
PDB	List of PDB id codes 1MFX
Enzyme activity
EC #	BRENDA	ExPASy	KEGG	MetaCyc
1.14.15.15	↗	↗	↗	↗

Gene location (Human)
Chr.	Chromosome 2 (human)
Band	2q35	Start	218,781,749 bp
Band	2q35	End	218,815,293 bp

Gene location (Mouse)
Chr.	Chromosome 1 (mouse)
Band	1 C4|1 38.54 cM	Start	74,752,733 bp
Band	1 C4|1 38.54 cM	End	74,777,051 bp
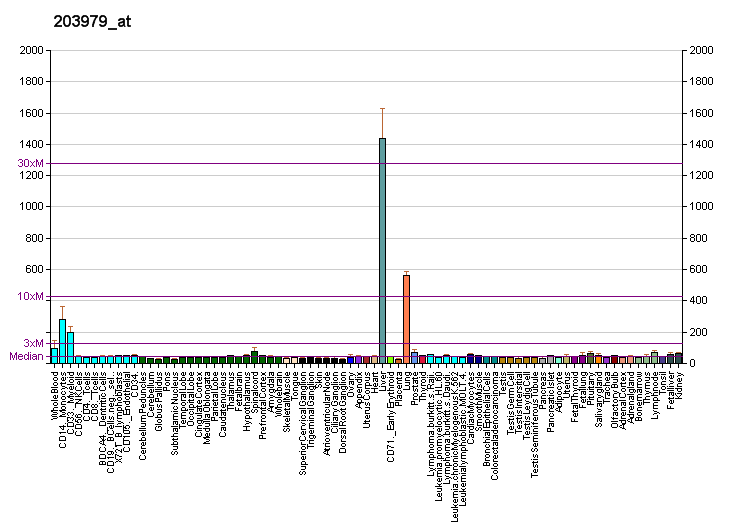
RNA expression pattern
Bgee	Human / Mouse (ortholog); Top expressed in: right lobe of liver; C1 segment; right adrenal cortex; tibial nerve; granulocyte; left adrenal gland; left adrenal cortex; upper lobe of left lung; mucosa of transverse colon; right uterine tube / Top expressed in: left lobe of liver; muscle of thigh; esophagus; skeletal muscle tissue; medial head of gastrocnemius muscle; triceps brachii muscle; temporal muscle; tibialis anterior muscle; vastus lateralis muscle; digastric muscle; More reference expression data
BioGPS	More reference expression data
Gene ontology
Molecular function	monooxygenase activity; iron ion binding; steroid hydroxylase activity; oxidoreductase activity; heme binding; oxidoreductase activity, acting on paired donors, with incorporation or reduction of molecular oxygen; metal ion binding; vitamin D3 25-hydroxylase activity; cholesterol 26-hydroxylase activity; cholestanetriol 26-monooxygenase activity
Cellular component	mitochondrial matrix; membrane; mitochondrial membranes; mitochondrion; mitochondrial inner membrane
Biological process	sterol metabolic process; bile acid biosynthetic process; cholesterol catabolic process; calcitriol biosynthetic process from calciol; lipid metabolism; steroid biosynthetic process; steroid metabolic process; cholesterol metabolic process
Sources:Amigo / QuickGO
Orthologs
Databases	NCBI: entry; OMA: entry
Species	Human	Mouse
Entrez	1593	104086
Ensembl	ENSG00000135929	ENSMUSG00000026170
UniProt	Q02318	Q9DBG1
RefSeq (mRNA)	NM_000784	NM_024264
RefSeq (protein)	NP_000775	NP_077226
Location (UCSC)	Chr 2: 218.78 – 218.82 Mb	Chr 1: 74.75 – 74.78 Mb
PubMed search
- Wikidata
View/Edit Human	View/Edit Mouse

CYP27A1 is a gene encoding a cytochrome P450 oxidase, and is commonly known as sterol 27-hydroxylase. This enzyme is located in many different tissues where it is found within the mitochondria. It is most prominently involved in the biosynthesis of bile acids.

== Function ==
CYP27A1 participates in the degradation of cholesterol to bile acids in both the classic and acidic pathways. It is the initiating enzyme in the acidic pathway to bile acids, yielding oxysterols by introducing a hydroxyl group to the carbon at the 27 position in cholesterol. In the acidic pathway, it produces 27-hydroxycholesterol from cholesterol whereas in the classic or neutral pathway, it produces 3β-hydroxy-5-cholestenoic acid.

While CYP27A1 is present in many different tissues, its function in these tissues is largely uncharacterized. In macrophages, 27-hydroxycholesterol generated by this enzyme may be helpful against the production of inflammatory factors associated with cardiovascular disease.

== Clinical significance ==
Mutations in CYP27A1 are associated with cerebrotendineous xanthomatosis, a rare lipid storage disease.

Inhibitors of CYP27A1 may be effective as adjuvants in the treatment of ER-positive breast cancer due to inhibition of the production of 27-hydroxycholesterol (which has estrogenic actions and stimulates the growth of ER-positive breast cancer cells). Some marketed drugs that have been identified as CYP27A1 inhibitors include anastrozole, fadrozole, bicalutamide, dexmedetomidine, ravuconazole, and posaconazole.

== Interactive pathway map ==
Click on genes, proteins and metabolites below to link to respective articles. (Note: The interactive pathway map can be edited at WikiPathways: "VitaminDSynthesis_WP1531".)

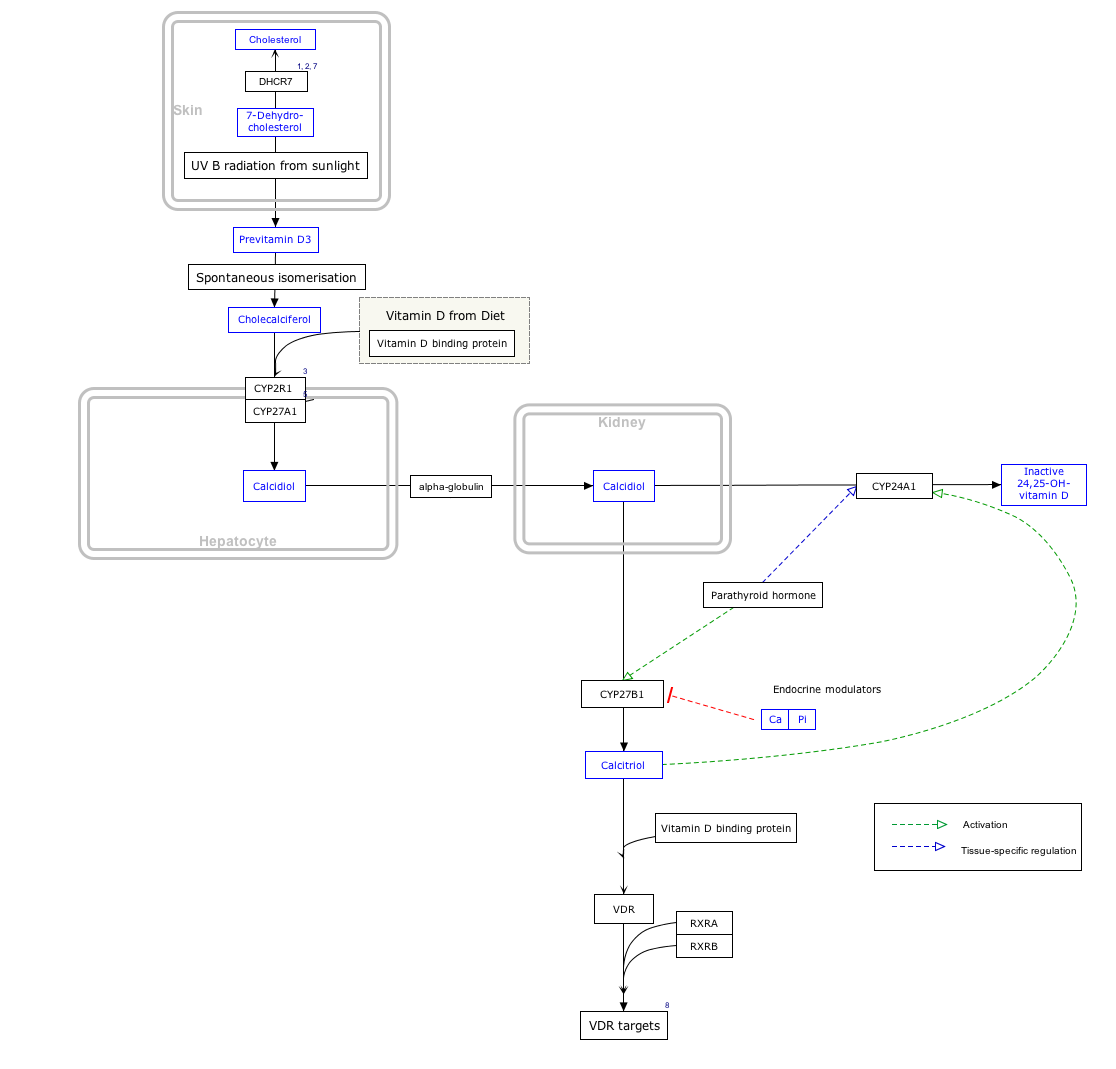

Vitamin D Synthesis Pathway (view / edit)

== See also ==
- Steroidogenic enzyme
- CYP27 family
