= Panthenol =

Organic compound, provitamin

- Stereo, skeletal formula of panthenol (R) D-panthenol

Names
- Preferred IUPAC name 2,4-Dihydroxy-N-(3-hydroxypropyl)-3,3-dimethylbutanamide
- Other names: Pantothenol; Pantothenyl alcohol; N-Pantoylpropanolamine; Bepanthen (trade name); Dexpanthenol (D form)

Identifiers
CAS Number	16485-10-2; 81-13-0 R
3D model (JSmol)	Interactive image
Beilstein Reference	1724945, 1724947 R
ChEBI	CHEBI:27373
ChEMBL	ChEMBL1200979
ChemSpider	4516; 115991 R; 4677984 S
ECHA InfoCard	100.036.839
EC Number	240-540-6
KEGG	D03726; D00193
MeSH	dexpanthenol
PubChem CID	4678; 131204 R; 5748487 S
RTECS number	ES4316500
UNII	WV9CM0O67Z; 1O6C93RI7Z (R)
CompTox Dashboard (EPA)	DTXSID3044598
- InChI: InChI=1S/C9H19NO4/c1-9(2,6-12)7(13)8(14)10-4-3-5-11/h7,11-13H,3-6H2,1-2H3,(H,10,14) Key: SNPLKNRPJHDVJA-UHFFFAOYSA-N
- SMILES: CC(C)(CO)C(O)C(=O)NCCCO

Properties
Chemical formula	C_{9}H_{19}NO_{4}
Molar mass	205.254 g·mol^{−1}
Appearance	Highly viscous, colourless liquid
Density	1.2 g mL^{−1} (at 20 °C)
Melting point	66 to 69 °C (151 to 156 °F; 339 to 342 K)
Boiling point	118 to 120 °C (244 to 248 °F; 391 to 393 K) at 2.7 Pa
log P	−0.989
Acidity (pK_{a})	13.033
Basicity (pK_{b})	0.964
Chiral rotation ([α]_{D})	+29° to +30°
Refractive index (n_{D})	1.499

Pharmacology
ATC code	A11HA30 (WHO) D03AX03 (WHO), S01XA12 (WHO)

Hazards
NFPA 704 (fire diamond)	1 1 0
- Lethal dose or concentration (LD, LC)
LD_{50} (median dose)	10,100 mg kg^{−1} (intraperitoneal, mouse); 15,000 mg kg^{−1} (oral, mouse)

Related compounds
Related compounds	Arginine; Theanine; Pantothenic acid; Hopantenic acid
- Except where otherwise noted, data are given for materials in their standard state (at 25 °C [77 °F], 100 kPa). verify (what is ?) Infobox references

Panthenol (also called pantothenol) is the alcohol analog of pantothenic acid (vitamin B_{5}), and is thus a provitamin of B_{5}. In organisms, it is quickly oxidized to pantothenic acid. It is a viscous transparent liquid at room temperature. Panthenol is used in pharmaceutical and children's products as a moisturizer and to hasten wound healing.

== Adverse effects ==
Panthenol is generally well-tolerated. In rare cases, skin irritation causing contact dermatitis and contact allergies have been reported.

== Pharmacology ==
Panthenol readily penetrates into the skin and mucous membranes (including the intestinal mucosa), where it is quickly oxidized to pantothenic acid. Pantothenic acid is extremely hygroscopic. It is also used in the biosynthesis of coenzyme A, which plays a role in a wide range of enzymatic reactions and in cell growth.

== Physical and chemical properties ==
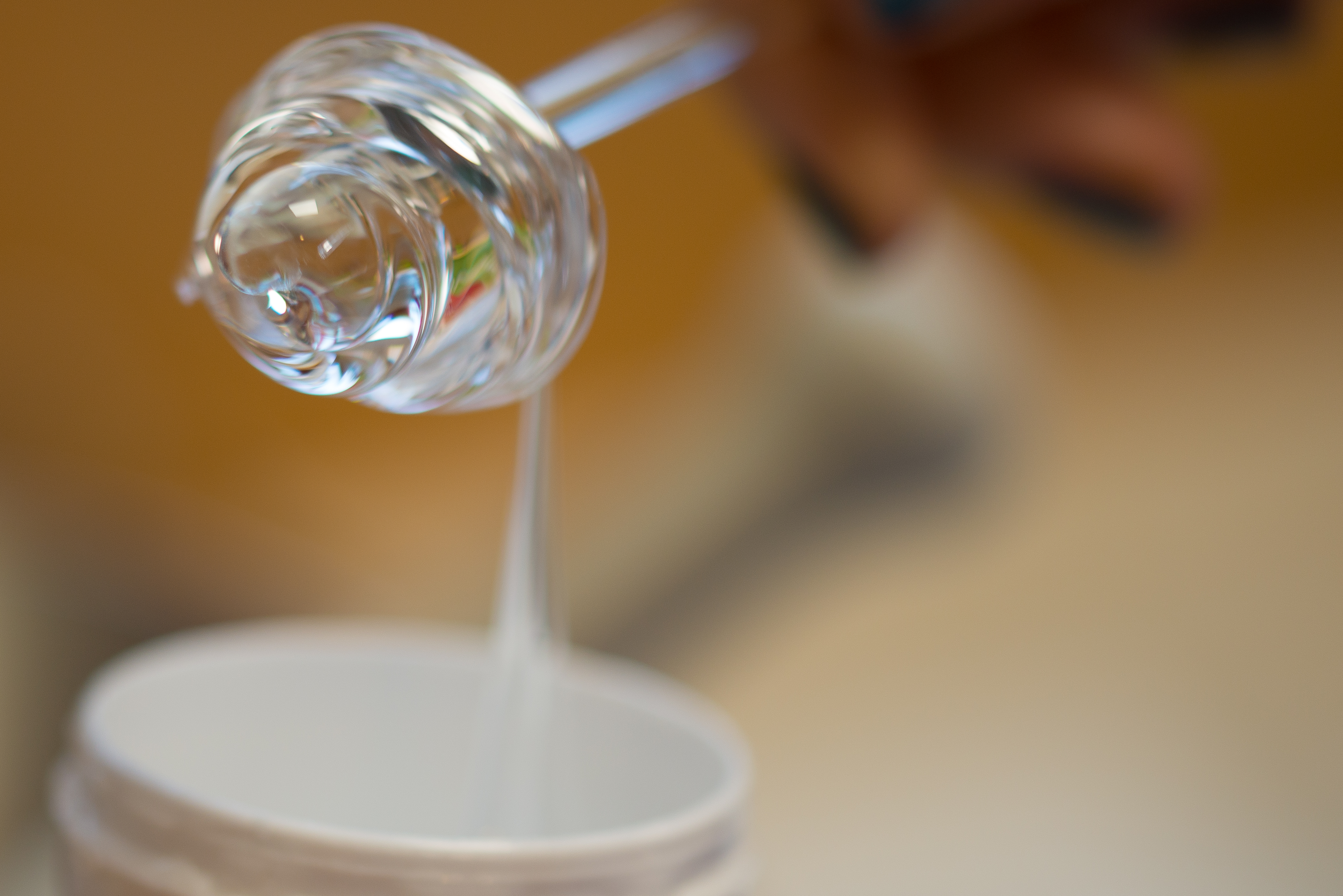
Dexpanthenol

Panthenol is an odourless, slightly bitter, highly viscous, transparent, and colourless liquid at room temperature, but salts of pantothenic acid (for example sodium pantothenate) are powders that are typically white. It is easily soluble in water and alcohol, moderately soluble in diethyl ether, soluble in chloroform (1:100), in propylene glycol, and slightly soluble in glycerin.

Panthenol's expanded chemical formula is HO–CH_{2}–C(CH_{3})_{2}–CH(OH)–CONH–CH_{2}CH_{2}CH_{2}–OH.

=== Stereochemistry ===
Panthenol comes in two enantiomers: D, and L. Only D-panthenol (dexpanthenol) is biologically active, however both forms have moisturizing properties. For cosmetic use, panthenol comes either in D form, or as a racemic mixture of D and L (DL-panthenol).
