= Previtamin D3 =

Previtamin D_{3}
- Stereo skeletal formula of previtamin D_{3} ((1R)-1-ol, (Z)-en, (1R,3aR,7aR)-7a-meth,-1-hept,-3a-hydro, (2R)-2-yl)

Names
- IUPAC name (3S,6Z)-9,10-Secocholesta-5(10),6,8-trien-3-ol
- Systematic IUPAC name (1S)-4-Methyl-3-[(Z)-2-{(1R,3aR,7aR)-7a-methyl-1-[(2R)-6-methylheptan-2-yl]-2,3,3a,6,7,7a-hexahydro-1H-inden-4-yl}ethen-1-yl]cyclohex-3-en-1-ol
- Other names Previtamin D_{3}

Identifiers
CAS Number	1173-13-3; 17592-07-3
3D model (JSmol)	Interactive image
ChemSpider	78098; 4832524 (E)-en; 9660762 (1S)-1-ol, (E)-en, (1R,7aR)-7a-meth,-1-hept, (2R)-2-yl; 9375051 (1S)-1-ol, (Z)-en, (1R,7aR)-7a-meth,-1-hept, (2R)-2-yl
ECHA InfoCard	100.013.304
EC Number	241-561-3
MeSH	Previtamin+D(3)
PubChem CID	86590; 6178113 (E)-en; 25245851 (1S)-1-ol, (Z)-en, (2R)-2-yl; 11485943 (1S)-1-ol, (E)-en, (1R,7aR)-7a-meth,-1-hept, (2R)-2-yl; 11199982 (1S)-1-ol, (Z)-en, (1R,7aR)-7a-meth,-1-hept, (2R)-2-yl
UNII	HDA46400N5; 6RR0I9PK8W
- InChI: InChI=1S/C27H44O/c1-19(2)8-6-9-21(4)25-15-16-26-22(10-7-17-27(25,26)5)12-13-23-18-24(28)14-11-20(23)3/h10,12-13,19,21,24-26,28H,6-9,11,14-18H2,1-5H3 Key: YUGCAAVRZWBXEQ-UHFFFAOYSA-N
- SMILES: CC(C)CCCC(C)C1CCC2C(C=CC3=C(C)CCC(O)C3)=CCCC12C

Properties
Chemical formula	C_{27}H_{44}O
Molar mass	384.648 g·mol^{−1}
- Except where otherwise noted, data are given for materials in their standard state (at 25 °C [77 °F], 100 kPa). Infobox references

Previtamin D_{3} (pre-D_{3}) is an intermediate in the production of cholecalciferol (vitamin D_{3}). It is formed by the action of UV light, most specifically UVB light of wavelengths between 295 and 300 nm, acting on 7-dehydrocholesterol (provitamin D_{3}) in the epidermal layers of the skin. This process is blocked effectively by sunscreens.

== Biochemistry ==
Under UV light, the B ring of the steroid nucleus structure in pro-D_{3} is broken open, making a secosteroid (pre-D_{3}). Pre-D_{3} exists in an equilibrium of two conformers, the coiled 5,6-s-cis (cZc) and the extended 5,6-s-trans (tZc), differing by the rotation around the 5,6 carbon-carbon single bond.

The cZc conformer undergoes spontaneous thermal isomerization into cholecalciferol (D_{3}) by a [1,7]-sigmatropic hydrogen shift. The two aforementioned reactions happen in animal skin as well as in vitro.

Vitamin D_{3} is a prohormone of the active form of vitamin D, calcitriol (1,25-(OH)_{2} D_{3}).

=== Side reactions ===
Pre-D_{3} can alternatively isomerize into two other products if it receives another UVB photon. In vivo this happens under high-dose or prolonged UVB exposure. A disrotatory electrocyclic ring-closure of the cZc conformer results in lumisterol 3 (L_{3}). A cis-trans isomerization of the tZc conformer at the Δ⁶ double bond results in tachysterol 3. Both reactions are reversible. These two products (and their derivatives) are not very effective vitamin D analogues, but they do have their own spectrum of biological activities.

=== Analogous reactions ===
The overall reaction mechanism (a provitamin is photochemically converted to a secosteroid previtamin, which is then thermally converted to the vitamin) is shared among all natural vitamin D analogues. Accordingly there are analogous compounds such as previtamin D_{2}, tachysterol 2, and lumisterol 2.

== Interactive pathway map ==
Click on genes, proteins and metabolites below to link to respective articles. (Note: The interactive pathway map can be edited at WikiPathways: "VitaminDSynthesis_WP1531".)

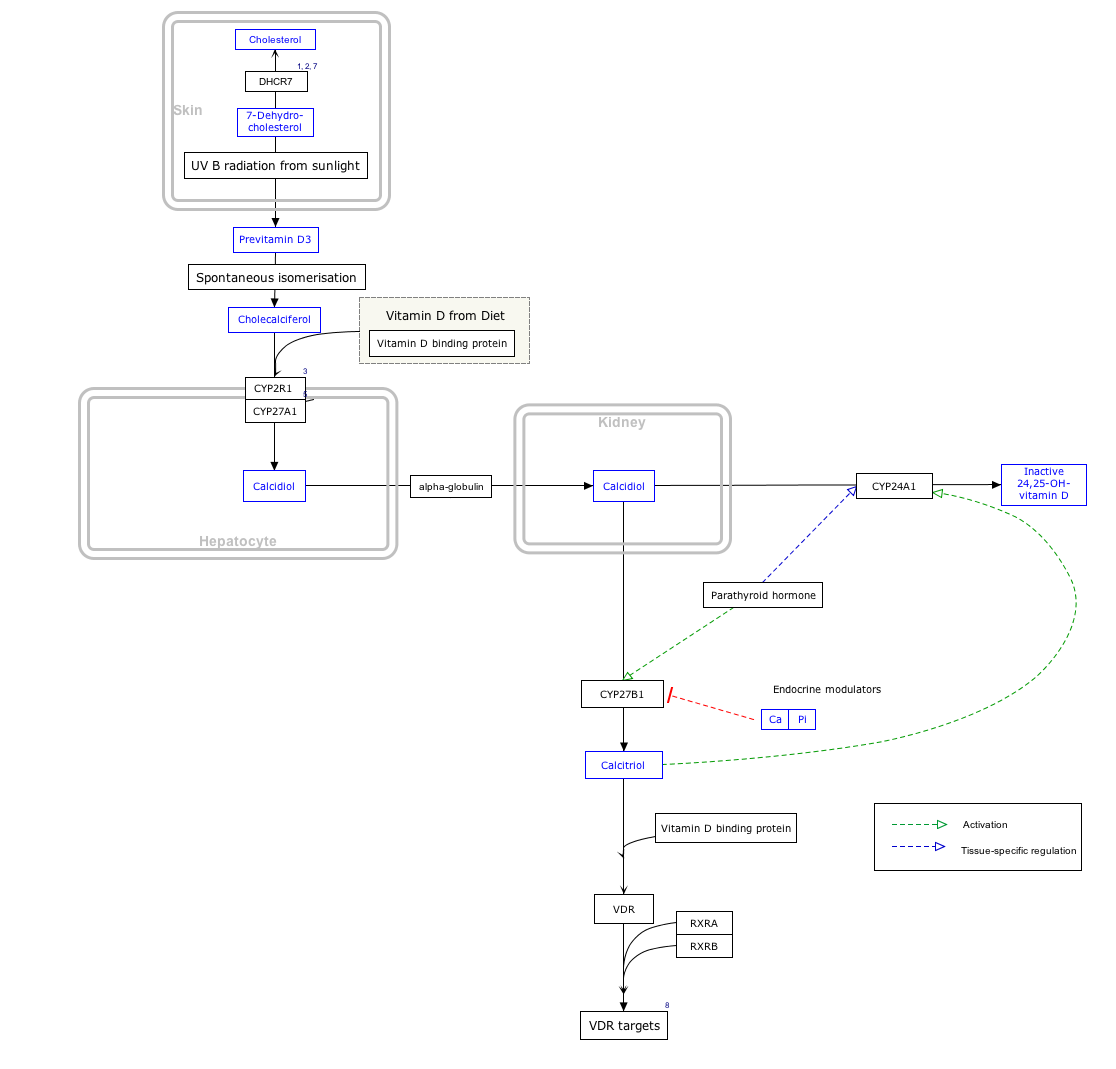

Vitamin D Synthesis Pathway (view / edit)
