= Β-Cryptoxanthin =

β-Cryptoxanthin
- Cryptoxanthin

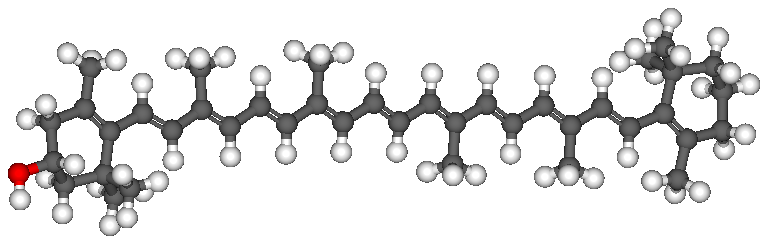

Names
- IUPAC name (3R)-β,β-Caroten-3-ol
- Systematic IUPAC name (1R)-3,5,5-Trimethyl-4-[(3E,5E,7E,9E,11E,13E,15E)-3,7,12,16-tetramethyl-18-(2,6,6-trimethylcyclohex-1-en-1-yl)octadeca-1,3,5,7,9,11,13,15,17-nonaen-1-yl]cyclohex-3-en-1-ol
- Other names: Cryptoxanthol; Caricaxanthin; (R)-all-trans-β-Caroten-3-ol; Hydroxy-β-carotene; kryptoxanthin

Identifiers
CAS Number	472-70-8
3D model (JSmol)	Interactive image
ChEBI	CHEBI:10362
ChemSpider	4444647
E number	E161c (colours)
PubChem CID	5281235
UNII	6ZIB13GI33
CompTox Dashboard (EPA)	DTXSID30912309
- InChI: InChI=1S/C40H56O/c1-30(18-13-20-32(3)23-25-37-34(5)22-15-27-39(37,7)8)16-11-12-17-31(2)19-14-21-33(4)24-26-38-35(6)28-36(41)29-40(38,9)10/h11-14,16-21,23-26,36,41H,15,22,27-29H2,1-10H3/b12-11+,18-13+,19-14+,25-23+,26-24+,30-16+,31-17+,32-20+,33-21+/t36-/m1/s1 Key: DMASLKHVQRHNES-FKKUPVFPSA-N; InChI=1/C40H56O/c1-30(18-13-20-32(3)23-25-37-34(5)22-15-27-39(37,7)8)16-11-12-17-31(2)19-14-21-33(4)24-26-38-35(6)28-36(41)29-40(38,9)10/h11-14,16-21,23-26,36,41H,15,22,27-29H2,1-10H3/b12-11+,18-13+,19-14+,25-23+,26-24+,30-16+,31-17+,32-20+,33-21+/t36-/m1/s1 Key: DMASLKHVQRHNES-FKKUPVFPBQ
- SMILES: O[C@@H]2C/C(=C(/C=C/C(=C/C=C/C(=C/C=C/C=C(/C=C/C=C(/C=C/C1=C(\C)CCCC1(C)C)C)C)C)C)C(C)(C)C2)C

Properties
Chemical formula	C_{40}H_{56}O
Molar mass	552.85 g/mol
Melting point	169 °C (336 °F; 442 K)
- Except where otherwise noted, data are given for materials in their standard state (at 25 °C [77 °F], 100 kPa). verify (what is ?) Infobox references

β-Cryptoxanthin is a natural carotenoid pigment. It has been isolated from a variety of sources including the fruit of plants in the genus Physalis, orange rind, winter squashes such as butternut, papaya, egg yolk, butter, apples, and bovine blood serum.

== Chemistry ==
In terms of structure, β-cryptoxanthin is closely related to β-carotene, with only the addition of a hydroxyl group. It is a member of the class of carotenoids known as xanthophylls.

In a pure form, β-cryptoxanthin is a red crystalline solid with a metallic luster. It is freely soluble in chloroform, benzene, pyridine, and carbon disulfide. It is insoluble in water like most β-carotenoids.

== Biology and medicine ==
In the human body, β-cryptoxanthin is converted to vitamin A (retinol) and is, therefore, considered a provitamin A. As with other carotenoids, β-cryptoxanthin is an antioxidant and may help prevent free radical damage to cells and DNA, as well as stimulate the repair of oxidative damage to DNA.

== Other uses ==
β-Cryptoxanthin is also used as a substance to colour food products (INS number 161c). It is not approved for use in the EU or USA; however, it is approved for use in Australia and New Zealand.
