= Cingestol =

Chemical compound

Clinical data
- Trade names: Lutisan
- Other names: 19-Nor-17α-pregn-5-en-20-yn-17β-ol; O.V. 28
- Routes of administration: Oral

Identifiers
- IUPAC name: (8R,9S,10R,13S,14S,17R)-17-Ethynyl-13-methyl-2,3,4,7,8,9,10,11,12,14,15,16-dodecahydro-1H-cyclopenta[a]phenanthren-17-ol
- CAS Number: 16915-71-2
- PubChem CID: 11954351
- ChemSpider: 10128646
- UNII: VLJ9702J11
- CompTox Dashboard (EPA): DTXSID70168666
- ECHA InfoCard: 100.037.225

Chemical and physical data
- Formula: C_{20}H_{28}O
- Molar mass: 284.443 g·mol^{−1}
- 3D model (JSmol): Interactive image
- SMILES: C[C@]12CC[C@H]3[C@@H](CC=C4CCCC[C@H]34)[C@@H]1CC[C@@]2(O)C#C
- InChI: InChI=1S/C20H28O/c1-3-20(21)13-11-18-17-9-8-14-6-4-5-7-15(14)16(17)10-12-19(18,20)2/h1,8,15-18,21H,4-7,9-13H2,2H3/t15-,16+,17+,18-,19-,20-/m0/s1; Key:HSYWFJBHXIUUCZ-XGXHKTLJSA-N

Cingestol (INN, USAN; former tentative brand name Lutisan; also known as 17α-ethynylestr-5-en-17β-ol) is a steroidal progestin of the 19-nortestosterone group that was never marketed. It was synthesized in 1969 and was developed in the 1970s by Organon as a low-dose, progestogen-only contraceptive, but in 1984, was still described as "under investigation". The drug is an isomer of lynestrenol with the double bond between C5 and C6.

== Chemistry ==
=== Synthesis ===
The chemical synthesis was originally reported in 1969.

Conversion of nandrolone benzoate into its corresponding enol acetate gives (1). The reduction of this with sodium borohydride gave a mixture of two epimeric alcohols, the beta-alcohol predominating (2). Halogenation of this alcohol gave the chloride (3). Lithium in ammonia cleaved of the halogen, the ester was also removed during this step, to give the alcohol 4. Oxidation with Jones reagent gave the ketone 5. Favorskii reaction provided cingestol (6) in the final step.

== See also ==
- Allylestrenol
