= Deaths in August 2010 =

The following is a list of notable deaths in August 2010.

Entries for each day are listed alphabetically by surname. A typical entry lists information in the following sequence:

- Name, age, country of citizenship at birth, subsequent country of citizenship (if applicable), reason for notability, cause of death (if known), and reference.

== August 2010 ==
=== 1 ===
- Robert F. Boyle, 100, American art director and production designer (North By Northwest, The Birds, Fiddler on the Roof).
- Bruce Garvey, 70, British-born Canadian journalist, lung cancer.
- Lolita Lebrón, 90, Puerto Rican nationalist.
- William MacVane, 95, American surgeon and politician, mayor of Portland, Maine (1971).
- Stig Mårtensson, 87, Swedish Olympic cyclist.
- K. M. Mathew, 93, Indian newspaper editor (Malayala Manorama).
- Eric Tindill, 99, New Zealand cricketer and rugby union player.

=== 2 ===
- Ian Castles, 75, Australian public servant, Australian Statistician (1986–1994).
- James Hunter, 56, American football player (Detroit Lions), apparent heart attack.
- Ole Ivar Lovaas, 83, Norwegian psychologist and researcher (Lovaas technique), Alzheimer's disease.
- José María Silvero, 78, Argentine footballer.
- Artemio Villanueva, 64, Paraguayan footballer
- Jan Wilson, 66, British politician, Leader of Sheffield City Council (1997–1999, 2002–2008), lung cancer.
- Rumen Yordanov, 51, Bulgarian Olympic wrestler.

=== 3 ===
- Kathleen Gemberling Adkison, 93, American abstract painter.
- Marilyn Buck, 62, American activist and terrorist, uterine cancer.
- Bruce M. Cohen, 65, American rabbi, cancer.
- James L. Gray, 84, British engineer.
- Bobby Hebb, 72, American singer-songwriter ("Sunny"), lung cancer.
- Antonio Subirana, 78, Spanish Olympic water polo player.
- Norman Walsh, 77, Zimbabwean air marshal.
- Edmund Zientara, 81, Polish Olympic footballer.

=== 4 ===
- Manuel Ayau, 84, Guatemalan businessman.
- Robert E. Davis, 70, American jurist, Chief Justice of the Kansas Supreme Court (2009–2010).
- Gary Johnson, 57, American football player (San Diego Chargers), stroke.
- Jim Kennan, 64, Australian lawyer and politician, Deputy Premier of Victoria (1990–1992), cancer.
- Henry A. Lardy, 92, American biochemist.
- Daikirin Takayoshi, 68, Japanese sumo wrestler, pancreatic cancer.

=== 5 ===
- Robert Baker Aitken, 93, American Zen Buddhist teacher, pneumonia.
- Godfrey Binaisa, 90, Ugandan politician, President (1979–1981).
- Francisco María Aguilera González, 92, Mexican Roman Catholic prelate.
- Sue Napier, 62, Australian politician, Leader of the Tasmanian Opposition (1999–2001), breast cancer.
- Jürgen Oesten, 96, German seaman, U-boat commander during World War II.
- Yuri Shishlov, 65, Russian football coach, shot.

=== 6 ===
- Ultus Álvarez, 78, Cuban baseball player.
- Cacilda Borges Barbosa, 96, Brazilian electronic musician.
- Julian Besag, 65, British statistician.
- Catfish Collins, 66, American guitarist (James Brown, Bootsy's Rubber Band, Parliament-Funkadelic), cancer.
- David C. Dolby, 64, American soldier, Medal of Honor recipient.
- Fredrik Ericsson, 35, Swedish mountaineer, falling accident on K2.
- Constantin Guirma, 90, Burkinabé Catholic prelate, bishop of Kaya (1969–1996).
- Tony Judt, 62, British historian, amyotrophic lateral sclerosis.
- John Louis Mansi, 83, British actor, lung cancer.
- Jeff McLean, 62, Australian rugby football player, cancer.
- Knut Østby, 87, Norwegian sprint canoer, Olympic silver medalist (1948).
- Jack Phipps, 84, British arts administrator.

=== 7 ===
- Roberto Cantoral, 75, Mexican composer, heart attack.
- Bruno Cremer, 80, French actor (Is Paris Burning?, Sorcerer, Maigret).
- Keith Drumright, 55, American baseball player (Houston Astros, Oakland Athletics).
- Jerry Flint, 79, American automotive journalist (Forbes), stroke.
- Leonid Gorbenko, 71, Russian politician, governor of Kaliningrad Oblast (1996–2000).
- Alex Johns, 43, American film producer (The Ant Bully) and television producer (Futurama), after long illness.
- John Nelder, 85, British statistician, President of the Royal Statistical Society (1985–1986).
- Werner Winter, 86, German linguist.

=== 8 ===
- Sikandar Alam, 71, Indian singer.
- Aleksandr Bokovikov, 53, Russian politician, governor of Evenk Autonomous Okrug (1997–2001), heart attack.
- Ken Boyes, 75, English footballer (York City F.C.).
- Charlie Davao, 75, Filipino actor, colorectal cancer.
- David Dixon, 87, American businessman, founder of the United States Football League.
- Alan Myers, 77, British translator.
- Patricia Neal, 84, American actress, (Hud, Breakfast at Tiffany's, The Day the Earth Stood Still), Oscar winner (1964), lung cancer.
- Jack Parnell, 87, British musician and bandleader (The Muppet Show), cancer.
- Bernhard Philberth, 83, German physicist, engineer, philosopher and theologian.
- Matthew Simmons, 67, American businessman and economist.
- Massamasso Tchangai, 32, Togolese footballer, after brief illness.

=== 9 ===
- Tab Baker, 49, American actor (Save the Last Dance, The Ice Harvest, Prison Break), heart attack.
- Lech Boguszewicz, 71, Polish Olympic athlete.
- George DiCenzo, 70, American character actor (Close Encounters of the Third Kind, Helter Skelter) and voice actor (She-Ra: Princess of Power), sepsis.
- Fernando Fernández, 70, Spanish illustrator and comic artist, after long illness.
- Robin Warwick Gibson, 66, British art historian.
- Gene Hermanski, 90, American baseball player (Brooklyn Dodgers).
- Calvin "Fuzz" Jones, 84, American blues bassist and singer.
- James C. Keck, 86, American physicist ane engineer.
- Herbert Kirschner, 85, German Olympic sprint canoer.
- Jay Larkin, 59, American television boxing executive (Showtime), brain tumor.
- Harry Lindbäck, 83, Swedish Olympic sprint canoer.
- Paul K. Longmore, 64, American historian and disability activist.
- Mariam Baharum, 75, Singaporean actress, natural causes.
- Juan Marichal, 88, Spanish historian.
- Paul Milstein, 88, American real estate developer.
- Roy Pinney, 98, American herpetologist, photographer, war correspondent and writer.
- Ronald Reid-Daly, 83, South African army officer (Rhodesian Army), founder and commander of the Selous Scouts.
- Ted Stevens, 86, American politician, Senator from Alaska (1968–2009), inventor of the term series of tubes, victim of 2010 Alaska plane crash.
- Mary Anne Warren, 63, American philosopher and academic.
- John Yaremko, 91, Canadian politician, MPP for Bellwoods (1951–1975).

=== 10 ===
- Ron Allen, 62, American poet and playwright.
- Gordon Robertson Cameron, 88, Canadian politician, Commissioner of Yukon (1962–1966).
- Brian Clark, 67, English footballer (Cardiff City F.C.), after long illness.
- Dana Dawson, 36, American actress and singer, colorectal cancer.
- Séamus Dolan, 95, Irish politician, Teachta Dála (1961–1965) and Senator (1965–1969, 1973–1982).
- Marie de Garis, 100, Guernseyan author.
- Slavko Koletić, 60, Croatian Olympic wrestler.
- Antonio Pettigrew, 42, American athletics coach, 1991 world champion and 2000 Olympic sprinter, suicide by drug overdose.
- Leo Pinto, 96, Indian field hockey player, Olympic gold medalist (1948).
- Thelma Pressman, 89, American microwave cooking consultant, opened first microwave cooking school in the United States.
- Jimmy Reid, 78, Scottish trade unionist and journalist.
- Armando Robles Godoy, 87, Peruvian film director, heart failure.
- Radomír Šimůnek Sr., 48, Czech racing cyclist, liver cirrhosis.
- Adam Stansfield, 31, English footballer (Exeter City F.C.), colorectal cancer.
- Shirley Thomson, 80, Canadian arts administrator, heart attack.
- David L. Wolper, 82, American film and television producer (North and South, Roots, The Thorn Birds), heart failure and Parkinson's disease.

=== 11 ===
- Gretel Beer, 89, Austrian-born British cookery and travel writer.
- David Hull, 75, American philosopher, pancreatic cancer.
- Sir Geoffrey Johnson-Smith, 86, British politician, MP for Holborn and St Pancras South (1959–1964), East Grinstead (1965–1983) and Wealden (1983–2001).
- Nellie King, 82, American baseball player and public address announcer (Pittsburgh Pirates).
- Ger Lagendijk, 68, Dutch footballer (Hermes DVS) and football agent, heart attack.
- Markus Liebherr, 62, Swiss businessman, owner of Southampton F.C.
- Kanapathy Moorthy, 77, Malaysian judoka.
- Dan Rostenkowski, 82, American politician, Representative from Illinois (1959–1995), lung cancer.
- Bruno Schleinstein, 78, German actor.
- Sesenne, 96, Saint Lucian singer.
- Lou Smit, 75, American police detective, investigated JonBenét Ramsey case, colorectal cancer.
- James Mourilyan Tanner, 90, British paediatrician.
- Sir Ron Trotter, 82, New Zealand businessman, cancer.
- Arnold Zellner, 83, American econometrician and statistician, cancer.

=== 12 ===
- Len Andrews, 87, Australian footballer.
- Isaac Bonewits, 60, American Neopagan leader and author, colorectal cancer.
- Guido de Marco, 79, Maltese politician, President (1999–2004), President of the United Nations General Assembly (1990).
- Laurence Gardner, 67, British writer and academic, lecturer on historical revisionism, after long illness.
- Richie Hayward, 64, American drummer (Little Feat), liver cancer.
- Manfred Homberg, 77, German Olympic boxer.
- André Kim, 74, South Korean fashion designer, pneumonia and colorectal cancer.
- Victor Kremer, 78, Luxembourgish Olympic shooter.
- Mario Laguë, 52, Canadian diplomat, Liberal Party communications director, road accident.
- Artur Olech, 70, Polish boxer, Olympic silver medalist (1964, 1968).
- Andrew Roth, 91, American-born British biographer and journalist, prostate cancer.
- Paul Ryan Rudd, 70, American actor (Beacon Hill, The Betsy), pancreatic cancer.
- Mohammad Ali Taraghijah, 67, Iranian painter.
- Luis Tascón, 41, Venezuelan politician, member of the National Assembly, colorectal cancer.

=== 13 ===
- Colin François Lloyd Austin, 69, British scholar.
- Panagiotis Bachramis, 34, Greek footballer (Veria F.C.), fishing accident.
- Helen Berg, 78, American statistician and politician, mayor of Corvallis, Oregon (1994–2006), peritoneal mesothelioma.
- Lance Cade, 29, American professional wrestler, (WWE, NWA, AJPW, HUSTLE), heart failure.
- Patrick Cauvin, 77, French novelist, complications from cancer.
- Jacques Faivre, 76, French Roman Catholic prelate, Bishop of Le Mans (1997–2008), heart attack.
- Alejandro Febrero, 85, Spanish swimmer.
- Albert Frost, 96, British businessman.
- Steve Jordan, 71, American accordionist, complications from liver cancer.
- Edward Kean, 85, American television writer (Howdy Doody), complications from emphysema.
- Alberto Müller Rojas, 75, Venezuelan military officer and politician, adviser to Hugo Chávez.
- Edwin Newman, 91, American journalist and newscaster (NBC News), pneumonia.
- Isaac Passy, 82, Bulgarian philosopher and art historian.
- Phil Petillo, 64, American luthier and engineer.
- Jan Reinås, 66, Norwegian businessman, cancer.
- David Rowland, 86, American industrial designer.
- Craig Van Tilbury, 53, American guitarist and chess master, heart attack.
- Janaki Venkataraman, 89, Indian First Lady (1987–1992), after short illness.

=== 14 ===
- Mervyn Alexander, 85, British Roman Catholic prelate, Bishop of Clifton (1974–2001).
- Rallis Kopsidis, 81, Greek painter.
- Herman Leonard, 87, American jazz photographer.
- Abbey Lincoln, 80, American jazz singer and actress (For Love of Ivy, Nothing But a Man).
- Lynn Lowe, 74, American politician, Chairman of the Arkansas Republican Party (1974–1980).
- Terje Stigen, 88, Norwegian author.
- Sherman W. Tribbitt, 87, American politician, Governor of Delaware (1973–1977).
- Gloria Winters, 78, American actress (The Life of Riley, Sky King), complications from pneumonia.

=== 15 ===
- Ahmad Alaadeen, 76, American jazz musician, bladder cancer.
- Ghazi Abdul Rahman Al Gosaibi, 70, Saudi Minister of Labour, after long illness.
- Dan Avey, 69, American radio personality, cancer.
- Joe L. Brown, 91, American baseball executive (Pittsburgh Pirates), after long illness.
- Denis E. Dillon, 76, American lawyer and politician, District Attorney of Nassau County, New York (1974–2005), lymphoma.
- James J. Kilpatrick, 89, American columnist and grammarian.
- Philip Markoff, 24, American murder suspect, suicide by exsanguination.
- Harrison Price, 89, American businessman, theme park pioneer.
- Alexander Prosvirnin, 46, Ukrainian Olympic Nordic combined skier.
- Lionel Régal, 35, French hillclimbing racer, car accident.

=== 16 ===
- John Amyas Alexander, 88, British archaeologist.
- Sten Christer Andersson, 67, Swedish politician.
- Nicola Cabibbo, 75, Italian physicist, President of the Pontifical Academy of Sciences, respiratory problems.
- Leon Ehrenpreis, 80, American mathematician.
- Christopher Freeman, 88, British economist.
- Dimitrios Ioannidis, 87, Greek army officer, junta leader.
- Meir Jacob Kister, 96, Israeli Arabist.
- Frank Ryan, 50, American plastic surgeon, car crash.
- Narayan Gangaram Surve, 83, Indian poet, after short illness.
- Bobby Thomson, 86, Scottish-born American baseball player (Shot Heard 'Round the World), after long illness.

=== 17 ===
- Francesco Cossiga, 82, Italian politician, Prime Minister (1979–1980) and President (1985–1992), respiratory problems.
- Frank C. Garland, 60, American epidemiologist, esophageal cancer.
- C. Joseph Genster, 92, American marketer (Metrecal), natural causes.
- Don Graham, 96, American real estate developer (Ala Moana Center), pneumonia.
- Franc Gubenšek, 72, Slovene biochemist, Alzheimer's disease.
- Amin al-Hindi, 70, Palestinian intelligence chief of the National Authority, pancreatic cancer.
- Sir Frank Kermode, 90, British literary critic and writer.
- Ludvík Kundera, 90, Czech writer and translator, recipient of the Jaroslav Seifert Prize.
- Alejandro Maclean, 41, Spanish television, film producer and aerobatics pilot, plane crash.
- François Marcantoni, 90, French gangster.
- Eugene McDonnell, 83, American computer scientist.
- Bill Millin, 88, British soldier, bagpiper during World War II.
- Edwin Morgan, 90, Scottish poet, The Scots Makar, pneumonia.
- Ricardo José Weberberger, 70, Austrian-born Brazilian Roman Catholic prelate, bishop of Barreiras (1979–2010).

=== 18 ===
- William Breuer, 87, American military historian.
- Carlos Hugo, Duke of Parma, 80, Spanish aristocrat, Carlist pretender to the Throne, cancer.
- Edelmiro Cavazos Leal, 38, Mexican politician, mayor of Santiago, shot. (body found on this date)
- Hal Connolly, 79, American hammer thrower, Olympic gold medalist (1956), brain trauma.
- Fiona Coyne, 45, South African television presenter (The Weakest Link), suspected suicide.
- Martin Dannenberg, 94, American World War II soldier, located the Nuremberg Laws, natural causes.
- Sepp Daxenberger, 48, German politician, bone marrow cancer.
- Steve DeLong, 67, American football player (San Diego Chargers).
- Kenny Edwards, 64, American singer-songwriter (The Stone Poneys), prostate cancer.
- Rina Franchetti, 102, Italian actress.
- Robert Gundlach, 84, American physicist and inventor.
- Benjamin Kaplan, 99, American jurist, Associate Justice of the Massachusetts Supreme Judicial Court (1972–1981), pneumonia.
- Ryszard Kosiński, 55, Polish Olympic sprint canoer.
- Christopher Kovacevich, 82, American Orthodox prelate, Metropolitan of Libertyville and Chicago, cancer.
- Mario G. Obledo, 78, American politician and activist, co-founder of MALDEF, heart attack.
- Rodolfo Salas, 82, Peruvian Olympic basketball player.
- Efraim Sevela, 82, Russian writer and screenwriter.
- Rod Shealy, 56, American political consultant, cerebral hemorrhage.
- Subair, 48, Indian actor, heart attack.
- Héctor Velásquez, 58, Chilean Olympic boxer, stroke.
- William Wilson, 97, British solicitor and politician (MP for Coventry South 1964–1974, Coventry South East 1974–1983).

=== 19 ===
- Skandor Akbar, 75, American professional wrestler and wrestling manager.
- Mitsuo Aoki, 95, American theologian.
- Michael Been, 60, American musician (The Call) and actor (The Last Temptation of Christ), heart attack.
- Gerhard Beil, 84, East German politician.
- Zenon Bortkevich, 73, Azerbaijani Olympic bronze medal-winning (1964) water polo player.
- Ahna Capri, 66, American actress (Enter the Dragon), car accident.
- Jackson Gillis, 93, American television writer (Columbo, Perry Mason), pneumonia.
- Suzanne Grossmann, 72, American actress and television writer, chronic obstructive pulmonary disease.
- David D. Kpormakpor, 74, Liberian politician, Chairman of the Interim Council of State (1994–1995).
- Dick Maloney, 77, Canadian singer.
- Joe Matthews, 81, activist and politician. (born 1929)
- Anker Sørensen, 84, Danish film editor and director.

=== 20 ===
- Pramarn Adireksarn, 96, Thai military officer and politician, blood infection.
- Johnny Bailey, 43, American football player (Chicago Bears, Arizona Cardinals), pancreatic cancer.
- Carys Bannister, 74–75, British neurosurgeon.
- James Dooge, 88, Irish politician and academic, Senator (1961–1977; 1981–1987), Minister for Foreign Affairs (1981–1982).
- Samuel Gaumain, 95, French Roman Catholic prelate, Bishop of Moundou (1960–1974).
- Gyda Hansen, 72, Danish actress, cancer.
- Jack Horkheimer, 72, American public television host (Jack Horkheimer: Star Gazer), executive director of Miami Planetarium, respiratory ailment.
- Samuel Lehtonen, 89, Finnish Lutheran prelate, bishop of Helsinki.
- Tiberio Murgia, 81, Italian actor.
- Conny Mus, 59, Dutch journalist, cardiac arrest.
- Charles S. Roberts, 80, American game designer and railroad historian.
- Michelle Schatzman, 60, French analyst and mathematician.
- Franz Schurmann, 84, American founder of Pacific News Service, Cold War expert on China, Alzheimer's disease and Parkinson's disease.
- Howard Boyd Turrentine, 96, American senior (former chief) judge of the District Court for the Southern District of California.
- David J. Weber, 69, American historian and author on the American Southwest, multiple myeloma.

=== 21 ===
- Alberto Ablondi, 85, Italian Roman Catholic prelate, bishop of Livorno (1970–2000).
- Magomedali Vagabov, 35, terrorist, leader of the Vilayat Dagestan, Supreme Quadi of the Caucasus Emirate, killed by Russian troops.
- Gheorghe Apostol, 97, Romanian politician, General Secretary of the Romanian Communist Party (1954–1955).
- Calvin Blignault, 30, South African mechanical engineer, traffic collision.
- Satch Davidson, 75, American baseball umpire (National League).
- Nancy Dolman, 58, Canadian actress (Soap), wife of Martin Short, natural causes.
- Harold Dow, 62, American television news correspondent (48 Hours), asthma.
- Rodolfo Enrique Fogwill, 69, Argentine writer, lung cancer.
- Melody Gersbach, 24, Filipina beauty queen, Binibining Pilipinas International (2009), car crash.
- Chloé Graftiaux, 23, Belgian rock climber, mountaineering accident.
- Hugo Guerrero Marthineitz, 86, Peruvian journalist, commentator and radio host, cardiac arrest.
- Sir Peter Gwynn-Jones, 70, British herald, Garter Principal King of Arms (1995–2010).
- Masaru Nashimoto, 65, Japanese reporter, lung cancer.
- Christoph Schlingensief, 49, German film and theatre director, lung cancer.
- Lakhdar Ben Tobbal, Algerian politician.

=== 22 ===
- A. K. Veerasamy, 84, Indian film actor.
- Raúl Belén, 79, Argentine footballer.
- Stjepan Bobek, 86, Yugoslavian footballer (1950 and 1954 FIFA World Cups, 1948 and 1952 Olympic silver medalist).
- Gheorghe Fiat, 81, Romanian Olympic bronze medal-winning (1952) boxer.
- Raymond Hawkey, 80, British graphic designer.
- Robert S. Ingersoll, 96, American politician, Assistant Secretary of State for East Asian and Pacific Affairs (1974), Deputy Secretary of State (1974–1976).
- Bengt Lindroos, 91, Swedish architect (Kaknästornet).
- Sir Donald Maitland, 88, British diplomat.
- Michel Montignac, 66, French nutritionist, creator of Montignac diet.
- Conny Stuart, 96, Dutch singer and actress.

=== 23 ===
- Marcel Albert, 92, French aviator, World War II flying ace.
- Tito Burns, 89, British musician, prostate cancer.
- Kihachirō Kawamoto, 85, Japanese puppet designer and animator.
- Dave McElhatton, 81, American television news anchor, complications of a stroke.
- Carlos Mendo, 77, Spanish journalist, founder of El País newspaper, after long illness.
- Natalie Nevins, 85, American singer (The Lawrence Welk Show), complications from hip surgery.
- Bill Phillips, 74, American country music singer.
- George T. Smith, 93, American politician and jurist, Lieutenant Governor of Georgia (1967–1971), Supreme Court of Georgia (1981–1991).
- George David Weiss, 89, American composer ("What a Wonderful World", "Can't Help Falling in Love", "The Lion Sleeps Tonight"), natural causes.
- Gareth Williams, 31, British intelligence officer (GCHQ seconded to MI6). (body discovered on this date)

=== 24 ===
- Douglas . Amdahl, 91, American jurist, Chief Justice of the Minnesota Supreme Court (1981–1989).
- Barkhad Awale Adan, app. 60, Somali journalist, shot.
- Maixent Coly, 60, Senegalese Roman Catholic prelate, bishop of Ziguinchor (since 1995).
- Idiris Muse Elmi, Somali politician, member of the Transitional Federal Parliament, victim of Muna Hotel attack.
- Geddi Abdi Gadid, Somali politician, member of the Transitional Federal Parliament, victim of Muna Hotel attack.
- Pierre Marie Gallois, 99, French brigadier general and geopolitician.
- Satoshi Kon, 46, Japanese film director (Perfect Blue, Tokyo Godfathers, Paprika), pancreatic cancer.
- Sir Graham Liggins, 84, New Zealand scientist, after long illness.
- Ian McDougall, 65, Canadian television producer, sudden heart failure.
- Bulle Hassan Mo'allim, Somali politician, member of the Transitional Federal Parliament, victim of Muna Hotel attack.
- Scotty Moylan, 94, Guamanian businessman and entrepreneur.
- Vladimir Msryan, 72, Armenian actor.
- Mohamed Hassan M. Nur, Somali politician, member of the Transitional Federal Parliament, victim of Muna Hotel attack.
- Acácio Rodrigues Alves, 85, Brazilian Roman Catholic prelate, bishop of Palmares (1962–2000).
- William B. Saxbe, 94, American politician, Senator from Ohio (1969–1974) and Attorney General (1974–1975), pancreatic cancer.
- Mitsuyo Seo, 98, Japanese animator.
- Gibson Sibanda, 66, Zimbabwean politician, cancer.

=== 25 ===
- Daniel P. Davison, 85, American banker and chairman (J.P. Morgan, Christie's, Metropolitan Museum, Burlington Northern), pancreatic cancer.
- Esther Earl, 16, American activist and vlogger, thyroid cancer.
- Andrew S. C. Ehrenberg, 84, British marketing scientist.
- Norm McAtee, 89, Canadian ice hockey player.
- Howard McDiarmid, 83, Canadian physician and politician, cancer.
- Clive Mitchell, 91, Australian politician, member of the Victorian Legislative Council (1968–1973).
- Jaime Prieto Amaya, 69, Colombian Roman Catholic prelate, bishop of Barrancabermeja (1993–2008) and Cúcuta (since 2008).

=== 26 ===
- Frank Baumgartl, 55, German Olympic bronze medal-winning (1976) steeplechaser, heart failure.
- John Karefa-Smart, 95, Sierra Leonean politician, Foreign Minister (1961–1964).
- Steve Laore, 46, Solomon Islands politician.
- William B. Lenoir, 71, American NASA astronaut, head injury.
- Bob Maitland, 86, British Olympic silver medal-winning (1948) cyclist, heart attack.
- Cal McLish, 84, American baseball player.
- Raimon Panikkar, 91, Spanish theologian.
- Jack Pitney, 47, American marketing executive (BMW North America), promoter of the Mini Cooper, tractor accident.
- Rustum Roy, 86, Indian physicist.
- Sarah Scazzi, 15, Italian murder victim.
- Charlotte Tansey, 88, Canadian educator.
- Walter Wolfrum, 87, German World War II Luftwaffe fighter ace.

=== 27 ===
- Juan Acevedo Pavez, 95, Chilean politician.
- Tony Borne, 84, American professional wrestler.
- John Calhoun, 85, American Olympic diver.
- Fermo Camellini, 95, Italian-born French road bicycle racer.
- Corinne Day, 48, British photographer (Vogue), brain tumour.
- James C. Gardner, 86, American politician.
- Anton Geesink, 76, Dutch judoka, 1964 Olympic gold medalist and member of the IOC.
- Bernard Goldberg, 84, American businessman, co-founder of Raymour & Flanigan, Alzheimer's disease.
- Hanna Grages, 87, German Olympic gymnast.
- George Hitchcock, 96, American poet and publisher.
- Ivan Ivanov, 73, Bulgarian Olympic wrestler.
- Marampudi Joji, 67, Indian Roman Catholic prelate, archbishop of Hyderabad (since 2000), cardiac arrest.
- Ravindra Kelekar, 85, Indian author, poet and activist, after short illness.
- Andrew McIntosh, Baron McIntosh of Haringey, 77, British politician and life peer, Greater London Council member (1973–1983), Captain of the Yeomen of the Guard (1997–2003).
- Oscar Ntwagae, 33, South African footballer, hit by automobile.
- Simone Scatizzi, 79, Italian Roman Catholic prelate, bishop of Fiesole (1977–1981) and Pistoia (1981–2006).
- Colin Tennant, 3rd Baron Glenconner, 83, Scottish noble, developer of Mustique.
- Luna Vachon, 48, Canadian professional wrestler, drug overdose.
- Sigurd Verdal, 83, Norwegian politician.
- Thomas White Jr., 71, American politician, member of the New York City Council (1992–2001, since 2006).

=== 28 ===
- Mohammad Hassan Ahmadi Faqih, 58-59, Iranian grand ayatollah.
- Keith Batey, 91, British codebreaker during World War II.
- Pietro Chiodini, 76, Italian cyclist.
- Daniel Ducarme, 56, Belgian politician, Minister-President of the Brussels Capital-Region (2003–2004), cancer.
- William P. Foster, 91, American marching band director (Florida A&M University).
- John Freeborn, 90, British fighter pilot and flying ace during World War II, age-related complications.
- Sinan Hasani, 88, Kosovar writer and politician, President of Yugoslavia (1986–1987).
- Isa Bakar, 58, Malaysian footballer.
- Augoustinos Kantiotes, 103, Greek Orthodox Metropolitan of Florina (1967–2000), renal failure.
- Robin Loh, 81, Singaporean businessman, founder of Robina, Queensland, breathing difficulties.
- Sir Richard Peek, 96, British admiral.
- Bill Strum, 72, American world champion curler.

=== 29 ===
- A. C. Baantjer, 86, Dutch author.
- Louis Bastide, 67, Malian judge and diplomat, President of the Supreme Court.
- Totti Cohen, 78, Australian educational activist.
- James Deuter, 71, American actor (Early Edition, Major League).
- Ary Fernandes, 79, Brazilian filmmaker, stroke.
- Gwen Gaze, 95, Australian-born American actress (I Cover the War).
- Lowell Jack, 85, American historian and broadcaster, cancer.
- Peter Lenz, 13, American motorcycle racer, racetrack crash.
- Victoria Longley, 49, Australian actress, breast cancer.

=== 30 ===
- Jairo Aníbal Niño, 68, Colombian writer.
- J. C. Bailey, 27, American professional wrestler, brain aneurysm.
- Dejene Berhanu, 29, Ethiopian Olympic runner, suicide.
- Franklin Brito, 49, Venezuelan agricultural producer and protester, starvation due to hunger strike.
- Louis Calebout, 82, Belgian Olympic boxer.
- Alain Corneau, 67, French filmmaker, cancer.
- Henryk Czapczyk, 88, Polish footballer.
- Patrick Dougherty, 78, Australian Roman Catholic prelate, bishop of Bathurst (1983–2008).
- Myrtle Edwards, 89, Australian cricketer and softball player.
- Owen Edwards, 76, British television executive, Director of BBC Wales (1974–1981).
- Lakshman Jayakody, 80, Sri Lankan politician, Minister of Buddhist Affairs (1994–2000), after short illness.
- Nicholas Lyell, Baron Lyell of Markyate, 71, British politician, MP (1979–2001), Solicitor General (1987–1992), Attorney General (1992–1997) and life peer, cancer.
- Jim MacLaren, 47, American triathlete.
- Irvin Rockman, 72, Australian politician and businessman, Lord Mayor of Melbourne (1977–1979), eye cancer.
- Mikhail Sado, 76, Russian Assyrian dissident, politician and scholar.
- Philip Tisson, 24, Saint Lucian footballer, shot.
- Lynn Turner, 42, American murderer, suicide by overdose of prescription medication.
- Francisco Varallo, 100, Argentine footballer, last surviving participant in the 1930 FIFA World Cup.

=== 31 ===
- Vance Bourjaily, 87, American novelist.
- Laurent Fignon, 50, French road bicycle racer, winner of 1983 and 1984 Tour de France, lung cancer.
- Jean-Marie Kélétigui, 78, Ivorian Bishop Emeritus of Katiola.
- Gail Koff, 65, American lawyer and partner in Jacoby & Meyers, leukemia.
- Mick Lally, 64, Irish actor (Glenroe, The Secret of Kells, Alexander), heart failure and emphysema.
- Andreas Miaoulis, 72, Greek basketball executive, cancer.
- Ken Orsatti, 78, American director of the Screen Actors Guild (1981–2000), pulmonary disease.
- Vladimir Raitz, 88, Russian-born British entrepreneur.
- Sid Rawle, 64, British campaigner.
- John Rowswell, 55, Canadian politician, Mayor of Sault Ste. Marie, Ontario.
- Vladimir Shkodrov, 80, Bulgarian astronomer, politician, professor and rector.
- Jef Ulburghs, 88, Belgian priest and politician.
