= Mohamed Ateye Farid =

Somali politician

Mohamoud Ateye Farid is a Somali politician, a member of the Transitional Federal Parliament. He was wounded in the attack on the Hotel Muna in Mogadishu by al-Shabaab. The attack killed four parliamentarians, Mohamed Hassan M. Nur, Geddi Abdi Gadid, Bulle Hassan Mo'allim and Idiris Muse Elmi, and wounded five. Mohamoud is political figure he was minister in Somaliland in1993 Also he is from Lughaya Awdal Region (Badaraxaan) Then he became Salal State president Before his death in 2016
