= Isaq Ibrahim Ali =

Somali politician

Isaq Ibrahim Ali is a Somali politician, a member of the Transitional Federal Parliament. He was wounded in the attack on the Hotel Muna in Mogadishu by al-Shabaab. The attack killed four parliamentarians, Mohamed Hassan M. Nur, Geddi Abdi Gadid, Bulle Hassan Mo'allim and Idiris Muse Elmi, and wounded five.
