= Ali Abdi =

Ali Abdi may refer to:

- Ali Abdi Farah (born 1947), Djiboutian politician
- Ali A. Abdi (born 1955), Canadian sociologist
- Ali Abdi Aware (born 1957), Somali politician
- Ali Abdi (activist) (born 1985), Iranian human rights activist
- Ali Abdi (footballer) (born 1993), Tunisian footballer
- Ali Shido Abdi, Somali politician
- Ali Abdi Farah (football manager), Somali football manager
- Ali Mohamud Abdi, Somali politician
- Ali Abdi (engineer), American engineer
- Ali Ahmed Abdi (died 2012), Somali journalist

== See also ==
- Abdi
- Ali (name)
