= Moallem =

Moallem (Arabic: معلم) is a surname of Persian and Arabic origins. Variations include Al-Moallem, and El-Moallem.

== Surnames ==
- Jasmin Moallem (born 1995), Israeli singer, songwriter, rapper, and record producer
- Minoo Moallem (born 1954), Iranian-born American educator, author, and scholar

=== Surname variations ===
- Farah Maalim (born 1956), Kenyan politician
- Ali Maow Maalin (1954-2013), Somali hospital cook and health worker
- Souhila Mallem (born 1988), Algerian actress
- Amal al-Moallimi, Saudi Arabian diplomat
- Ali Abdikadir Mo'allim (died 2010), Somalian politician
- Bulle Hassan Mo'allim (died 2010), Somalian politician
- Shuli Mualem (born 1965), Israeli nurse and politician
- Edward Muallem (born 1958), Palestinian actor, director, and drama trainer
- Walid Muallem (1941–2020), Syrian diplomat

== Middle name ==
- Ahmed Moalim Fiqi, Somalian politician
- Omar Moʽallim Nur, Somalian military commander

== Given name ==
- al-Mu'allimi, Yemeni Islamic scholar
- Muallim Naci, Ottoman writer, poet, educator and literary critic

== See also ==
- Ma'lamat al-Maghrib, encyclopedia
- Moallem Kola, place name disambiguation page
- Moallem sani
- LM3ALLEM, song
