= Pitney (surname) =

Pitney is a surname but can be used as a first name as well. Notable people with the surname include:

- Arthur Pitney (1871–1933), inventor
- Blanche Pitney (1898–1986), American politician
- Gene Pitney (1940–2006), American singer-songwriter
- Woody Pitney (born c. 1991), singer-songwriter
- Mo Pitney (born c. 1993), singer-songwriter
- Jack Pitney (1963–2010), American marketing executive
- John Oliver Halstead Pitney, co-founder of the law firm Pitney & Hardin
- Mahlon Pitney (1858–1924), jurist and politician
- Nico Pitney (born c. 1982), American journalist
- Pat Pitney (born 1965), American university president and Olympic gold medalist
