= Darryl Isaacs =

American author (born 1964)

- Born: Darryl Lee Isaacs; February 18, 1964 (age 62)
- Occupations: Author, personal injury attorney, internet personality
- Years active: 1993 - present
- Website: wewin.com

Darryl Lee Isaacs (born February 18, 1964), is an American author, personal injury attorney, and internet personality. He is the co-founder of Isaacs & Isaacs and Brain Trust Legal Group, a think tank for attorneys and entrepreneurs to network and share legal and business strategies. Also known as The Kentucky Hammer and Heavy Hitter, he rose to national prominence in 2020 due to a widely viewed Super Bowl ad for his firm. In 2023, he published his debut book, Build Your Billion-Dollar Law Firm!: I Did It, and You Can, Too, co-authored with Chris Vander Kaay. From 2024-25, he hosted a web series called Hammer’s Law, written and directed by Vander Kaay, exploring strange and unusual legal cases.

== Career ==
In 1993, Isaacs, along with his father, founded Isaacs & Isaacs, a personal injury law firm.

Isaacs and his firm are known in Kentucky for their more than 500 different television, radio, and print ads. As a result of his advertising and having been the subject of numerous viral videos, he was called the most famous person in Kentucky.

Isaacs rose to national prominence in the 2010s when his firm began producing a series of elaborate Super Bowl commercials, one of which went viral and received over 12 million views on YouTube in 2020. The A.V. Club called the firm's 2020 advertisement one of the best ads of Super Bowl LIV.

Isaacs created and managed several attorney associations called Mastermind Groups throughout the United States for the purposes of networking and developing legal strategies. This led to Isaacs founding the Brain Trust Legal Group, which brings law firm owners, CEOs, and marketing professionals together to share information and grow their firms. His live marketing and management summit in Las Vegas has featured celebrity attorneys such as Ben Crump, Rex Parris, Mike Morse, and Andrew Finkelstein.

In 2023, Isaacs signed an endorsement deal with the University of Minnesota for the Golden Gophers soccer team to use his name, image, and likeness for publicity purposes.

In 2023, Isaacs co-authored a book with filmmaker and executive coach Chris Vander Kaay about law firm practice management. From 2024-2025, Isaacs produced three seasons of a streaming series called "Hammer's Law," exploring strange and comical legal cases. The series was written by Vander Kaay and Preston Fassel, with Vander Kaay also directing and producing. Isaacs hosted the first and third seasons of the show; for its second season, the series was temporarily renamed "Weirdly Legal" and hosted by Vander Kaay. Vander Kaay had previously co-authored a book with Isaacs

== Personal life ==
In 2015, Isaacs was in a life-threatening accident when he was struck by a motorist while on his bicycle. He suffered a broken neck and brain swelling, in addition to lower back, shoulder, and knees injuries. Following the accident, Isaacs became involved in bicycle safety related campaigns and philanthropy programs.

In 2022, Isaacs went viral on TikTok for videos he posted documenting his attempts to lose weight following his accident. As a result, Green District, a chain of salad restaurants in Kentucky, Indiana, and Ohio named the "Hammer Time" salad after him, with a percentage of the proceeds benefiting special needs charities.

== Philanthropy ==
Isaacs is a patron of The Salvation Army's Angel Tree Foundation, which provides toys and clothes to impoverished families at Christmas. He is also a supporter of the American Red Cross' donations program Louisville. Following a bicycling accident, he began giving away free bike helmets in his Helmets for Kids campaign.

In 2007, Isaacs established the Betty and Shelly Isaacs Scholarship at Louisville's Trinity High School in honor of his parents. The scholarship is renewable and is awarded to sophomores on a need base. It is one of the largest scholarships at Trinity funded by a single individual.

== In popular culture ==
Jack Harlow, who grew up seeing Isaacs' commercials, wrote a song called "Heavy Hitter", inspired by Isaacs.

== Bibliography ==
- Isaacs, Darryl, and Vander Kaay, Chris. (2023) Build Your Billion-Dollar Law Firm!: I Did It, and You Can, Too! ISBN 979-8398605099
