= LegalMatch =

American online legal services company

- Website type: Legal Services
- Founded: November 1999; 26 years ago
- Headquarters: Reno, Nevada, {{{location_country}}}
- Founders: Anna Ostrovsky; Dmitry Shubov
- Key people: Dmitry Shubov (CEO); Kurt Jerdon (CFO); Ken LaMance (Secretary/Board of Directors); Yevgeniy Korablev (Board of Directors); Mary Therese Cabatingan (Board of Directors)
- Industry: Internet

LegalMatch is a private company headquartered in Reno, Nevada in the United States. It operates an online legal matching service where people submit a legal case and get responses including ratings and quotes from lawyers interested in their case. The service is free to use for those posting a case, while lawyers contract with LegalMatch to gain access to the leads generated. In addition to its headquarters, LegalMatch has offices in Las Vegas, Nevada and Austin, Texas.

== History ==
The company was founded in 1999 by Anna Ostrovsky and Dmitri Shubov. LegalMatch started its online service in 2000 in San Francisco, California. The service grew quickly, with website traffic increasing 300% in the first year after launch. In 2013, LegalMatch expanded its operations to include a facility in Reno, Nevada.

== Services ==
Applicants are asked to complete a form describing their legal case on the LegalMatch website. LegalMatch then provides that information to attorneys that have both paid for registration with LegalMatch and match the specialization needed. The number of attorneys in each practice area within a specific geography are capped. After hiring an attorney, the client can write a review that will be posted to the lawyer's profile. In addition to providing free legal matching services to clients, LegalMatch provides informational content via an Online Law Library and Law Blog.

== Ethics rules ==
A California appeals court determined that any attorney lead provider "directing a potential client to an attorney," including LegalMatch, was a lawyer referral service for the purposes of ethics rules for lawyers. LegalMatch California, a LegalMatch subsidiary, became officially certified as a California State Bar Certified Referral Service in September 2020 and is listed on the State Bar of California's website as an accredited lawyer referral service in all 58 California counties.
