= Muna Hotel =

Hotel in Mogadishu, Somalia

- Location in Somalia

General information
- Location: Mogadishu, Somalia
- Coordinates: 2°2′22″N 45°20′14″E
- Owner: Abdullahi Warsame (manager)

Muna Hotel (Arabic: فندق منى, Somali: Funduq Muna, French: Hotel Muna) is a hotel in Mogadishu, Somalia. The hotel, located less than a mile from Somalia's presidential palace, is a noted conference centre and is regularly used for meetings between government officials and important persons.

== History ==
In 2010 it was the centre of a suicide attack, killing several members of the Somali Parliament amidst the fighting that began on 23 August.

== Architecture ==
Contemporary reports described the Muna Hotel as a multi-storey building on a street corner in Mogadishu, close to Villa Somalia and within an area controlled by Somali government and African Union forces. Contemporary descriptions of the facade noted mint and pink paint, grey shutters, two projecting pink balconies, and exterior signage reading "Hotel Muna" in French, with Arabic text below.

== See also ==
- Muna Hotel attack
