= Preston Fassel =

American horror author and journalist

- דוד מנחם פאסל
- Fassel at Comicpalooza
- Born: Preston Andrew Fassel; September 11, 1985 (age 41); Houston, Texas, U.S.
- Citizenship: American
- Education: Sam Houston State University
- Occupations: Author; Journalist
- Writing career
- Language: English
- Genre: Horror
- Notable work: Our Lady of the Inferno
- Notable awards: President's Volunteer Service Award; Independent Publisher Book Award for Horror

Preston Fassel (born September 11, 1985) is an American author, journalist, film critic, and producer primarily known for his work in the horror and crime genres. His work has appeared in Fangoria, Rue Morgue, Screem magazine, Dread Central, The Daily Grindhouse, and Cinedump.com. He is the author of Remembering Vanessa, the first biography of actress Vanessa Howard, published in the Spring 2014 issue of Screem. From 2017 to 2020, he was a staff writer for Fangoria; in 2018, the magazine published his debut novel, Our Lady of the Inferno, as the first entry in their "FANGORIA Presents" imprint. The book received an overwhelmingly positive critical response, and was named one of the ten best horror books of 2018 by Bloody Disgusting. Since the book's publication he has been described as a cult author.

== Early life ==
Fassel was born in Houston, Texas, but spent his childhood between St. Louis, Missouri and Broken Arrow, Oklahoma. He was raised with both Catholic and Jewish religious and cultural traditions; his mother's family came from a line of Poles and crypto-Jews. His father worked for the phone company, and he grew up around telecommunications equipment, later comparing part of his childhood experience to the aesthetics of Videodrome.

When he was seventeen, Fassel dropped out of high school and obtained his GED after budget cuts resulted in the elimination of most of his school's elective courses. After obtaining his GED, he interned for the Broken Arrow police department evidence room, where he received the President's Volunteer Service Award for his work. He attended community college at Lone Star College in Conroe, Texas, where he began writing short stories set in 1970s Times Square that were published in the campus's literary journal. He late transferred to Sam Houston State University, from which he graduated in 2011 with a degree in psychology.

Fassel spent his teenage years renting horror and exploitation films from local video rental stores in Oklahoma, initially out of a desire to desensitize himself to disturbing imagery and as an act of defiance against what he perceived of as the oppressively conservative culture of rural Oklahoma; he would later credit his love of horror cinema as contributing to his desire to become a horror writer. He further credited his mother's purchasing him a copy of Stephen King's The Shining with inspiring him to become a horror writer, and Bill Landis and Michelle Clifford's Sleazoid Express with interesting him in 42nd street culture.

== Career ==
Fassel initially began writing for an optometric trade publication while working as an optician, receiving a job offer after writing a letter to the editor. He later transitioned into writing for Rue Morgue after pitching a story to their editor-in-chief at a horror convention, beginning by writing reviews and later transitioning into writing feature stories. During his time at the magazine, Fassel was nominated for the Rondo Hatton Classic Horror Award for an interview he conducted with Herschell Gordon Lewis. Concurrently to his time with Rue Morgue, Fassel also contributed to the pop culture websites Cinedump.com and HeardTell.com, being nominated for a further two Rondo awards for an interview with Kelli Maroney and in the best category article, respectively. He spent 2013 researching the life of actress Vanessa Howard, culminating in the first published biography of her, "Remembering Vanessa," printed in the Spring 2014 issue of Screem magazine.

Beginning in 2007, Fassel began working on a book he would later call "the theater story" that acted as an expansion of the short stories he had written in college; he worked on it for a period of about six years before shelving the project because "it was really terrible" and, despite being 250,000 words, "nothing had happened in it yet." He would later recycle ideas from "the theater story" into his debut novel, Our Lady of the Inferno. Fassel initially sold the book to an independent press called Fear Front based out of Georgia, shortly before the company went out of business. Around the time of the book's publication, Fassel worked as an extra on the set of Puppet Master: The Littlest Reich, where he met producer Dallas Sonnier, who expressed interest in acquiring the film rights; Fassel later convinced Sonnier to purchase the republication rights as well. Fassel additionally asked for a job with Sonnier's production company, Cinestate, as part of the deal, unaware that Sonnier had recently purchased Fangoria magazine; Sonnier subsequently hired Fassel to work for the publication. He joined the staff as a writer in 2017; from 2018 until the magazine's 2020 sale, he wrote a column called Corrupt Signals, focusing on obscure and foreign horror cinema. For his work with Fangoria, Fassel was nominated for a Rondo award for best column and (along with Tate Steinsiek) best article.

Fangoria republished Our Lady of the Inferno in September 2018 to generally positive reviews. It was named one of Bloody Disgusting's ten best horror books of 2018, and won gold in the horror category at the 2019 Independent Publisher Book Awards

In 2018, it was announced that a film adaptation of the book was in development at Fangoria, with Fassel collaborating on the screenplay and serving as an executive producer alongside Sonnier and Phil Nobile Jr.

In 2019, it was announced that Fangoria would publish Fassel's second novel, Beasts of 42nd Street, in 2020. In 2020, he served as the editor for Mick Garris' debut anthology, These Evil Things We Do. Following the 2020 sale of Fangoria to Tara Ansley and Abhi Goel, Fassel said that the publishing rights to Beasts had reverted to him, and that the option on the film rights to Our Lady of the Inferno would expire in 2022. In 2021, he published his first novella, a science fiction horror-comedy, The Despicable Fantasies of Quentin Sergenov, with 35% of proceeds going to The Trevor Project.

In 2021 Fassel published his first nonfiction work, Landis: The Story of a Real Man on 42nd Street, the first ever biography of Sleazoid Express founder Bill Landis, which also includes a history of the magazine. It was later adapted into an audiodrama starring Kelli Maroney, produced by Fassel and Mark Alan Miller.

In 2022, pre-production began on the feature film The Eyes of Jefferson, a fictionalized retelling of the life of Dallas serial killer Charles Albright, which Fassel co-wrote with director Jonathan Brownlee.

In 2023, Beasts of 42nd Street was released through Cemetery Dance Publications. The book received mostly positive reviews and received an honorable mention at the 2024 Rondo Hatton Classic Horror Awards.

From 2024-2025, Fassel was a staff writer for Hammer's Law, a webseries created and hosted by Darryl Isaacs. Fassel wrote eight episodes of the series.

Fassel co-wrote the script for the 2026 thriller Marrow with director Mitch McLeod and star Jessica Dawn Willis, based on a story by McLeod. Inspired by a stalking incident from McLeod's own life, Fassel incorporated many autobiographical elements into the screenplay. Starring Michael Ironside and Danielle Harris, the film premiered to generally positive reviews at the USA Film Festival.

In 2026, it was announced that a script by Fassel, Bridgette Wrona and the Whisper Creek Murders, based on a concept by Cameron Hazelwood, had been adapted into a film by Mary Beth McAndrews and starring Kelli Maroney. Fassel revealed to Daily Dead that he had written the role, described as "[the] resident Blanche DuBois, a resale shop proprietress with a shadowy connection to the town’s past," especially for Maroney.

== Personal life ==
Fassel is Jewish, and has said his cultural heritage has had a "tremendous impact" on him. He is a member of Temple Emanu-El.

== Awards and nominations ==
Year	Award	Category	Work	Result
2017	Rondo Hatton Classic Horror Award	Best Interview	Hershell Gordon Lewis Interview, Rue Morgue Magazine	Nominated
2018	Rondo Hatton Classic Horror Award	Best Interview	Kelli Maroney Interview, Cinedump.com	Nominated
2018	Rondo Hatton Classic Horror Award	Best Article	"Less is More: On the Need for a Return to Generic Horror," HeardTell.com	Nominated
2019	Rondo Hatton Classic Horror Award	Best Article	"Master of Puppets/How to Slit your own Throat" (With Tate Steinsiek), Fangoria	Nominated
2019	Independent Publisher's Book Award	Horror	Our Lady of the Inferno	Won
2021	Rondo Hatton Classic Horror Award	Best Interview	Joe Zito/Barney Cohen (Friday the 13th Part 4), Dread Central	Nominated
2021	Rondo Hatton Classic Horror Award	Best Column	Corrupt Signals, Fangoria	Nominated
2022	Rondo Hatton Classic Horror Award	Book of the Year	Landis: The Story of a Real Man on 42nd Street	Nominated
2022	Independent Publisher's Book Award	Horror	The Despicable Fantasies of Quentin Sergenov	Won
2024	Rondo Hatton Classic Horror Award	Book of the Year	Beasts of 42nd Street	Nominated

== Bibliography ==
=== Novels ===
- 2016: Our Lady of the Inferno
- 2023: Beasts of 42nd Street

=== Novellas ===
- 2021: The Despicable Fantasies of Quentin Sergenov

=== Nonfiction ===
- 2021: Landis: The Story of a Real Man on 42nd Street
- 2023: Necessary Death: What Horror Movies Teach Us About Navigating the Human Experience

=== Anthologies ===
- 2019: My Favorite Horror Movie 3: Scream Warriors (essay "Videodrome")

==== As editor ====
- 2020: These Evil Things We Do: The Mick Garris Collection by Mick Garris

== Filmography ==
=== Films and shorts ===
Year	Title	Director	Producer	Writer	Actor	Notes
2004	The Monstor	Yes	Yes	Yes	Yes	Co-director; Short film
2017	Frightmakers 101	No	No	Yes	Yes	Self; documentary
2018	More Blood!	No	No	No	Yes	Self; documentary
2018	Puppet Master: The Littlest Reich	No	No	No	Yes	Man in Lobby/Puppet Victim; Additional Puppeteer; body double for Udo Kier
2019	VFW	No	No	No	Yes	Hyper
2022	Bad Girl Boogey	No	Yes	No	No	Associate Producer
2024	.ask	No	Yes	No	No	Producer
2025	Ana and Mia	No	Yes	No	No	Associate Producer
2025	House of Ashes	No	Yes	No	No	Associate Producer
2025	The R.I.P. Man	No	Yes	No	No	Executive Producer
2026	Marrow	No	No	Yes	No	Script with Mitch McLeod and Jessica Dawn Willis
TBA	Bridgette Wrona and the Whisper Creek Murders	No	Yes	Yes	Yes	Screenplay Based on a Concept by Cameron Hazelwood; Associate Producer; Post Production
TBA	The Eyes of Jefferson	No	No	Yes	No	Co-written with Johnathan Brownlee, inspired by the book 'The Eyeball Killer' by John Matthews and Christine Wicker; Pre-production

=== Streaming and web series ===
Year	Title	Director	Producer	Writer	Actor	Notes
2024-2025	Hammer’s Law	No	No	Yes	No	8 episodes
2025	Found Footage Finds	No	No	No	Yes	Self; docuseries; 4 episodes
