= Legal advertising in the United States =

In the United States, advertising of services by members of the profession of law is typically permitted but regulated by state court and bar association rules.

Advertisements for lawyers and law firms take various forms: print, television, radio, the yellow pages, and online advertising. Among the most common type of legal advertisements are those by tort lawyers, whose branch of law includes personal injury, medical malpractice, negligence, and product liability cases involving compensation for harm or damages caused by another. Yet legal advertisements are used by lawyers who specialize in other areas of the practice of law, including criminal defense, bankruptcy, property law, and family law.

== History ==
Before the Canons of Professional Ethics were published by the American Bar Association (ABA) in 1908, advertising within the legal profession was common. The ABA believed that lawyer advertising was unprofessional and shone a negative light on the profession of law. They also realized that a court was a place where parties can "inflict heavy losses on one another". The ABA wanted to prevent the bringing forth of cases wherein there was no basis for their claim. Lawyers were still allowed to be included in law directories which contained the lawyers basic information, including their name and contact information. They were also allowed to print business cards and use professional letterhead, but otherwise advertising was strictly prohibited. The Chicago Bar Association believed that "The most worthy and effective advertisement possible...is the establishment of a well-merited reputation for professional capacity and fidelity to trust".

=== Concerns ===
In the Bates v. State Bar of Arizona case, the Arizona State Bar argued against advertising by law firms because they believed that advertising would place too much burden on the legal system. They believed that the advertising may be too effective and dangerously increase litigation. They also believed that lawyers would raise the cost of their services in order to compensate for their increased overhead due to the additional cost of advertising. Another fear was that the legal profession would be viewed as a common trade rather than the noble profession they believed they were part of.

Bar associations and consumer advocates were concerned that the members of the public would not protect themselves against false or misleading lawyer advertisements. The bar also argued that legalizing advertising would cause more and more people to pursue a career in law. This was a result of a study that showed that between the years of 1951 and 1971 the number of lawyers increased by 326%. They also believed that an increase in advertising would promote a larger client base and would make it harder for lawyers to serve their clients.

=== Bates v. State Bar of Arizona ===
In 1972, John Bates and Van O'steen were admitted to the State Bar of Arizona. Immediately after their admittance to the bar the pair began working for the Maricopa County Legal Aid Society. After working there for a period of two years they founded their own practice.

As a firm they handled cases for clients who could not qualify for government grants despite moderate incomes. Bates and O’steen decided that, rather than charge expensive fees for their services, they would focus on a large volume of cases in order to generate their income; as such, the firm focused its practice on low-fee cases such as uncontested divorces, adoptions, simple bankruptcy cases, and name changes. They realized that in order to obtain the necessary volume they needed to advertise their name and their services to the public. Bates and O’steen placed an advertisement in the Arizona Republic on February 22, 1976. The State Bar acted reviewed the case. Both Bates and O'steen were suspended from practicing law for six months in accordance with the regulations of the State Bar of Arizona. Bates and O'steen petitioned the Arizona Supreme Court to review their case on the grounds that a total ban on advertisement violated the Sherman Antitrust Act and the First Amendment to the United States Constitution. The state supreme court rejected both of their claims, but did reduce their suspensions, in part, because the court believed that Bates and O’steen advertised as a way to test the constitutionality of the ban on advertising within the legal industry.

The Supreme Court of the United States recognized that they had the power to review judicial decisions of lower courts and set the case for argument. Chief Justice Warren E. Burger threw out the claim that a total ban on advertising by lawyers and law firms was in violation of the Sherman Antitrust Act. He based his position on the precedent set in Goldfarb v. Virginia State Bar. This case set the precedent that "lawyers engage in trade or commerce," and lawyers and the practice of law were therefore NOT exempt from the Sherman Antitrust Act.

On the claim of the violation of free speech, the Supreme Court ruled in favor of Bates and O'steen, stating that Arizona's ban of advertising "inhibit[ed] the free flow of information and ke[pt] the public in ignorance". The Supreme Court therefore removed the ban on advertising. However, they still allowed the State Bar to "regulate" advertising in order to make certain that the information presented was true and did not mislead others or make false claims. State bar associations across the country quickly began to lift their bans on advertising.

=== Advertising boom ===
After the U.S. Supreme Court decision, law firm advertising activity increased significantly. Initially the majority of lawyer advertisements were directed at "car wreck" victims. Later, advertising attempted to recruit clients affected by medications that were recalled for safety reasons or had unanticipated or undisclosed side effects.

In the top 75 television markets nationwide, 2,000 lawyers advertise on television and spend close to $200 million collectively on advertising. Twenty percent of low-income households who have sought after legal counsel or advice have found their lawyer through the lawyer’s advertisements.

It is estimated that 75 percent of law firms advertise. Research has suggested that the smaller the firm the more likely they are to advertise. According to an article published in the Service Marketing Quarterly, 94% of Americans are familiar with lawyer television advertisements.

== Regulations ==
The ABA has laid down a standard for regulation of lawyer advertising: “The state may prohibit speech that is false or misleading. If the communications are truthful and non-deceptive, the state may limit [advertisements] if the state asserts a substantial government interest. The regulation under scrutiny must directly advance state interest. The regulation must be a reasonable fit narrowly tailored to achieve the desired objective." There has conflict between law firms and the ABA since lawyer advertising was made legal.

The ABA's rules do not have force of law and are not enforced by state bar associations. Individual state bar associations continue to restrict and regulate advertisements. For example, New York print ads are only allowed to contain the address and phone number and only print specialties unless the firm is licensed in that specialty.

Court challenges to advertising restrictions have produced mixed results. In Florida Bar v. Went For It, Inc. (1995), the Supreme Court of the United States upheld, by a 5–4 vote, Florida rules barring lawyers from sending targeted direct-mail solicitations to accident and disaster victims and their relatives for 30 days after the event, finding that the state had substantial interests both in protecting the privacy of victims and their families and in preventing the erosion of public confidence in the legal profession.

Florida's advertising rules, which the Eleventh Circuit described in 2010 as reflecting a long trend toward increasingly restrictive controls on attorney advertising, have been the subject of repeated litigation. In 2011, a federal court held void for vagueness the rules barring "manipulative" advertisements and the requirement that advertising provide only "useful, factual information", while rejecting vagueness challenges to the rules against promising results and describing the quality of a lawyer's services. In 2014, another federal court struck down the Bar's guidelines interpreting its rules to bar any reference to past results in billboard, other display, television and radio advertising, holding that the Bar offered no evidence that the prohibition served its stated interests. Comparable rules elsewhere have also been challenged, including New York restrictions on several common advertising techniques and a Louisiana ban on referring to past results, which the Fifth Circuit held unconstitutional in 2011 while upholding that state's prohibition on advertisements promising results.

In August 2026, Morgan & Morgan sued The Florida Bar in the United States District Court for the Northern District of Florida over Florida Rule of Professional Conduct 4-7.15(c), which bars lawyer advertisements containing "the voice or image of a celebrity". The firm argued that the rule violates the First Amendment and is unconstitutionally vague under the Fourteenth Amendment. In October 2026, the Florida Bar responded that the firm lacked standing to bring the case.

== Forms of advertising ==
In past decades, legal advertising relied heavily on traditional phone directories, notably including Yellow Pages advertisements. In more recent years, as the use of traditional telephone directories has declined, advertisement efforts have shifted to other media and technologies.

Lawyers advertise in traditional media, including television, the radio and in newspapers. Due to the cost of television advertising, marketing through television is usually limited to a small number of law firms with large advertising budgets, and to lawyer networks and commercial referral services that direct clients to participating lawyers. Relatively small numbers of lawyers advertise on radio. With the decline of the printed newspaper, much lawyer advertising has shifted away from print and has gone online.

Some lawyers have historically marketed their services through client newsletters. Historically newsletters were printed documents that were mailed to clients. Many law firm newsletters are now offered by email.

Some lawyers directly market themselves to potential clients by direct mail. For targeted direct mail, lawyers may obtain information about people who have potential legal issues from public records or other sources, then contact those potential clients to indicate that they are available to provide representation. Direct mail advertising must be conducted carefully to avoid violating state rules of professional conduct. Lawyers may also send non-targeted advertisements by mail, such as general information about their law firm and its services or invitations to attend seminars conducted by the firm.

Most law firms now have at least a basic website to market their services. Many law firms use various forms of online marketing and advertisement to reach prospective clients, including promotions through media focused on their local market, participation in advertising networks, the use of social media, and online directories and referral services. Some lawyers market themselves by publishing information online, whether on their own websites or weblogs, or through third party websites.

== See also ==
- Lawyer referral service
