= Cedric Garland =

American epidemiologist

Dr. Cedric Garland is an epidemiologist known for his research in the field of vitamin D deficiency. He has written upwards of 150 articles and books on the subject. Garland partnered with his late brother Frank C. Garland in some of this research. Their most widely cited paper is Garland CF, Garland FC, Gorham ED, et al. "The Role of Vitamin D in Cancer Prevention." American Journal of Public Health 2006;96(2):252-261. doi:10.2105/AJPH.2004.045260, cited 829 times according to Google Scholar.
