= Our Lady of the Inferno =

Horror novel by Preston Fassel

- Fangoria Presents cover art by Ashley Detmering
- Author: Preston Fassel
- Cover artist: Jerry Winnett (Fear Front); Ashley Detmering (Fangoria)
- Language: English
- Genre: Novel; Horror; Psychological Horror; Grotesque
- Publisher: Fear Front; Fangoria
- Publication date: December 28, 2016 (Fear Front); September 11, 2018 (Fangoria)
- Publication place: United States
- Media type: Print (Paperback)
- Pages: 298 (Fear Front); 376 (Fangoria)
- ISBN: 978-1946487087
- Followed by: Beasts of 42nd Street

Our Lady of the Inferno is a novel by horror journalist and author Preston Fassel and the first officially licensed novel published by Fangoria magazine under their Fangoria Presents imprint. It was originally published by Fear Front, an independent press, in 2016, and was only briefly in print before the company closed in early 2017. In May 2018, Fangoria magazine announced that it had acquired the book and would be printing it as "Fangoria Presents #1," the inaugural entry in an imprint of branded horror novels.

Set in 1983 Manhattan, the book tells the intersecting stories of Ginny Kurva, a twenty-one-year-old polymath working as a prostitute in Times Square; and Nicolette Aster, a safety inspector at Fresh Kills Landfill who moonlights as a serial killer. It received a generally positive reception, winning the 2018 Independent Publishing Award for Horror and the FANGORIA reissue being named by Bloody Disgusting as one of the 10 best horror books of 2018. Reviews tended to praise its complex treatment of female characters within the horror genre, particularly Nicolette, who received favorable comparisons to Patrick Bateman. Reviews also tended to focus positively on the book's attention to period detail, especially in evoking the 42nd Street vice district of the early 1980s.

A film adaptation was in development between February 2018 and July 2020. In 2019, it was announced that Barbara Crampton would voice Nicolette in an audio drama adaptation being produced by Mark Alan Miller. The adaptation, also featuring Mick Garris and Doug Bradley, was released in 2021.

== Plot ==
Ginny Kurva is a twenty-one-year-old, alcoholic polymath living in a welfare hotel 1983 Times Square, where she cares for her paraplegic younger sister, Trisha, by working as a prostitute. Ostensibly subservient to her pimp, an elderly Polish gangster known as "The Colonel," Ginny has manipulated him into making her the de facto head of his criminal operations. In this capacity, she both protects the other girls in her care and instructs them in science, mathematics, and literature, in the hopes that they one day be able to obtain legitimate employment. Ginny's only respite comes in the form of riffing on low-budget horror films with her best friend, Roger, in the Colossus, a grindhouse they both frequent. One evening, Roger informs Ginny that he witnessed one of her girls, Tina, assumed to have run away, being lured into the back of a distinct green van. Ginny dismisses the claim as paranoia.

It is revealed that the van belongs to Nicolette Aster, the safety inspector at Fresh Kills Landfill. Plagued by frequent hallucinations involving murder and violence, Nicolette hides behind a mask of sanity, which allows her to move about the landfill unmolested; after hours, she travels into the city to abduct sex workers, bringing them back to hunt and kill.

Ginny learns that one of her charges—a sixteen-year-old named Mary whom she regards as a daughter—has become pregnant. Ginny pays for The Colonel to perform an abortion on her, but he attempts the procedure drunk and leaves the girl with severe genital mutilation. The incident takes an intense psychological toll on Ginny, who has long repressed the moral implications of her work, and she begins drinking more heavily.

Nicolette's memories reveal that she was severely disturbed as a child but doted upon by her overprotective father, who guarded her from the wrath of her abusive, superficial mother, who herself regarded the average-looking girl as monstrous compared to her own physical beauty. Following her mother's death, Nicolette's father had her committed to an insane asylum where she spent the remainder of her youth, where she learned to mimic "normal" behavior. Due to the phonetic similarity between "Aster" and the Greek Asterion, Nicolette has come to believe that she is a reincarnation of the Minotaur, and that the city of New York offers her prostitutes as "tributes" to hunt, kill, and eat in accordance with the myth. To enhance her fantasy, Nicolette has constructed a suit of armor, including a horned helmet with incorporated prescription lenses to correct her severe hyperopia. Having witnessed Ginny's academic and physical prowess, Nicolette has come to regard her as an "alpha bitch" to be taken as a special trophy.

Roger conducts his own investigation into Tina's disappearance and learns from other pimps and prostitutes on 42nd street of multiple disappearances stretching back three years. The consistency of the stories disturbs Ginny, though she finds herself unsure of how to respond. After being made to spend a promised day off recruiting another girl to replace Mary, Ginny suffers a nervous breakdown, insults her girls, assaults Roger, and goes on a drinking binge that ends with her attacking a group of police officers after they raid the Colossus. Roger intervenes, posing as Ginny's brother and convincing them she's mentally ill; the police release her into his custody. Later, Ginny and Roger reconcile. Going to apologize to her girls, Ginny realizes that one has been taken by Nicolette and begins making plans to flee 42nd street.

The next day, Ginny instructs her girls to meet in Mary's room at the end of the day. There, she explains the situation and tells them all to flee New York, taking their day's earnings with them rather than pay their usual share to the Colonel and providing them with extra money out of her own savings. Going to say goodbye to Roger, the pair are cornered by an intoxicated Colonel, who believes that Ginny is attempting to undermine his power. He attempts to shoot Roger to death, but only succeeds in grazing him. In turn, Roger blows his head off with a shotgun.

Ginny, Roger, and Trish flee to a motel in Hell's Kitchen, where Ginny confesses to Roger that she and Trish came to New York after she murdered their sexually abusive mother, an incident which put an end to her hoped-for teaching career. The pair confess their love for one another and Ginny agrees to take Roger with her when she leaves the city, telling him to wait with Trish while she goes to dispose of the shotgun he used to kill The Colonel.

While depositing the shotgun in a garbage can, Ginny is cornered and abducted by Nicolette, who takes her to the dump. The pair fight, but Ginny discovers that her martial arts skills are useless against Nicolette's armor. Preparing to admit defeat, Ginny realizes the unusual appearance of Nicolette's eyes is due to corrective lenses. Ginny allows Nicolette to close in on her and then uses her high heels to shatter Nicolette's lenses, forcing her to remove the helmet. Equally matched, the women engage in hand-to-hand combat. Ginny emerges victorious after she gains control over the axe and bisects Nicolette's face. Before leaving, she steals Nicolette's watch to pawn for bus fare.

Ginny makes her way out of the dump and takes a cab back to Hell's Kitchen. The next day, she, Roger, and Trish board a bus out of New York. Ginny realizes she feels optimistic about the future for the first time in years.

== Development ==
Our Lady of the Inferno is Fassel's first novel. It began life in 2007 as a book about the employees of a Times Square grindhouse in the 1970s that he stopped working on after six years because "it was really terrible" and, despite being 250,000 words, "nothing had happened in it yet." He then began developing the Nicolette character, but couldn't come up with an idea for a final girl to serve as her foil; he credits the invention of Ginny to a meeting with the Soska Sisters during his time writing for Rue Morgue magazine, during which Jen Soska told him that her favorite swear word is "kurva," meaning "whore." The idea of a woman whose last name was "Kurva" served as the impetus for creating the Ginny character.

Fassel wrote the book over the course of six months in 2014 while working full-time as an optician in Houston, Texas, writing for two hours every night after coming home from work. Although he used certain ideas, settings, and research he'd conducted for "the theater story," he wrote Our Lady in homage to 1980s horror movies as opposed to 1970s exploitation films, drawing particular influence from Night of the Comet, and said he wanted the book to evoke the feeling of renting a movie on Friday night as a teenager. He compared the clash between Ginny and Nicolette to the dichotomy between the optimism of 1980s cinema and the nihilism of exploitation movies, and also said that it was his intent to create iconic female characters for female horror fans to embrace.

== Release ==
The book was originally published by Fear Front, an independent press, in December 2016. It was only in print for a period of months and, per Fassel, sold "like twenty copies" before the company went out of business; in the interim, the book came to the attention of Cinestate, the new parent company of Fangoria, who acquired the publishing and film rights. In May 2018, it was announced that Fangoria would be reissuing the book in September 2018, and that a film adaptation is in development.

== Reception ==
The book has received overwhelmingly positive reviews, particularly for its treatment of female characters, its attention to historical detail as regards 1980s era 42nd street, and its portrayal of a female villain.

Bloody Disgusting named the novel one of the ten best horror books of 2018, praising it for "great character work and gritty horror" and for not "being afraid to get brutal". Izzy Lee, writing for Diabolique, favorably compared Fassel to Joe Lansdale, writing "Fassel's observations on humanity go way further than his years on this planet...well-paced, full of intimate detail, and so unlike anything I've ever read that I can’t help but give it my highest recommendation to fans of genre and those interested in the plight of the downtrodden. The story is full of strong women and never panders or feels exploitative, regardless of its subject matter… That in itself is extraordinary". Lee also named it #2 on a list of "Top 10 Must-Read Recent Horror Novels."

Former Fangoria writer Amy Seidman, writing for the website Fear Forever, similarly praised the book and its approach to its female characters, saying "Fassel has created some really well-developed and interesting female characters who aren’t following in the usual steps of women in horror films―especially when compared to the 1980’s, when misogyny was at its peak. He’s a master at crafting and painting a scene so thoroughly that it leapt off the pages." Seidman further favorably compared Nicolette to a "female Patrick Bateman" and praised the book's vivid descriptions of settings around 42nd Street. Jennifer Bonges, writing for PopHorror, similarly praised the book's setting and Nicolette's characterization, calling her "one of the most disturbing villains ever". Rue Morgue's Monica S. Kuebler also gave the book a positive review, saying "...the final showdown is a fitting knockdown, drag-out battle between two of the toughest broads in the Big Apple. If you've ever felt the '80s needed more chicks that kicked ass, Inferno has them in spades." Cemetery Dance praised the book's period detail while also expressing surprise that, in contrast to simply being a standard slasher, it was instead "a delicious piece of grindhouse literature stocked with strong characters, a vivid sense of place, and real, raw emotion." The podcast Nightmare on Film Street called the book "brilliant" and praised the characterization of both Nicolette and Ginny.

Jack Ketchum called the book "quirky" and said that "Fassel is definitely a writer to watch". Australian novelist Isobel Blackthorn likewise praised the book, saying "Written with grace, restraint and poise, the prose is evocative, at times almost poetic; edgy when it needs to be, sometimes suggestive...And when the horror does take place, its detail is measured and carefully crafted."

Other reviews were more mixed. The Daily Grindhouse called it a "very good first novel" and praised the characterization of Ginny and Tricia's relationship, but called the book "fifty pages too long" and Ginny's dialogue "overwhelming," and questioned whether the story could have been more effective if Nicolette were a more sympathetic character. Katie Rife, writing for The A.V. Club, similarly praised the book's characterization and slow burn approach while also criticizing the novel's stylized dialogue. Leigh Monson, writing for birth.movies.death, called the book "an enjoyable read, dripping in 1980s nostalgia" and "a great character study," with particular praise for the book's treatment of Ginny, but questioned whether she and Nicolette's stories should have been the focus of their own separate novels.

== Accolades ==
Bloody Disgusting named the book one of the ten best horror novels of 2018.

The book won the 2018 Independent Publishing Award for Horror.
