= Sleazoid Express =

Sleazoid Express (1980–1985, and later editions) was the house journal of the exploitation film scene in New York circa 1964-1985. Founded as a one-sheet (later to expand to four to six pages) by Bill Landis, an NYU graduate, projectionist, and devotee of the crime-ridden grindhouses, the magazine not only captured the genre affections but the whole Times Square milieu of drugs, violence and prostitution. Typical films featured in the magazine, which centered 42nd Street, included The Love Butcher, Pink Motel, Shocking Asia, Boardinghouse and Do Me Evil. Approximately 48 issues were published over a five-year period, the first issue being dated June 18, 1980, and the last issue appearing in the fall of 1985.

In 1999, Bill Landis and Michelle Clifford (co-author of the Kenneth Anger biography, Anger) began to publish Sleazoid Express again. Seven issues of the revamped magazine were published, each issue running more than 70 pages. The seventh issue from 2005, never mentioned on the magazine’s website and only advertised via private email correspondence, was a biography of Bloodsucking Freaks director Joel M Reed. This was followed in 2007 by 30 Years on the Deuce: The Wicked Die Slow, a collection of older articles written by Landis in the 1980s and 1990s for the SoHo Weekly News, the Village Voice, Swank and the original Sleazoid Express.

In 2002, excerpts from old issues, along with new material from Landis and Clifford, were compiled into the book Sleazoid Express: A Mind Twisting Tour Through the Grindhouse Cinema of Times Square, released by Simon and Schuster.

In 2021, Bloody Disgusting announced that Preston Fassel had written a biography of Landis and history of the magazine titled Landis: The Story of a Real Man on 42nd Street, to be published December 2021.
