= Andrew Finkelstein =

American trial attorney

- Education: Syracuse University (BS); Brooklyn Law School (JD)
- Occupation: Attorney
- Employer(s): Finkelstein & Partners, LLP; Jacoby & Meyers, LLP
- Title: President of the New York State Trial Lawyers Association
- Term: 2025–2026

Andrew Finkelstein is an American trial attorney. He is the managing partner of Finkelstein & Partners, LLP, and of Jacoby & Meyers, LLP. He also leads several affiliated plaintiffs' law firms in New York and Massachusetts. In 2025, he became the 58th president of the New York State Trial Lawyers Association (NYSTLA). He was involved in Jacoby & Meyers, LLP v. Presiding Justices, a federal lawsuit challenging New York's prohibition on non-lawyer investment in law firms.

== Early life and education ==
Finkelstein received a Bachelor of Science degree from Syracuse University and Juris Doctor from Brooklyn Law School, graduating in 1991.

== Career ==
=== Law practice ===
Finkelstein is the managing partner of Finkelstein & Partners, LLP, a personal injury firm based in Newburgh, New York, which employs approximately 350 people. He also leads Jacoby & Meyers, LLP, Fine, Olin & Anderman, and Finkelstein, Blankinship, Frei-Pearson & Garber, LLP. His practice has focused on representing plaintiffs in wrongful death and catastrophic personal injury cases.

=== Non-lawyer ownership litigation ===
In 2011, Finkelstein led an effort by Jacoby & Meyers to overturn rules prohibiting non-lawyers from investing in law firms, filing lawsuits that argued the restrictions were unconstitutional and prevented firms from raising capital to deliver legal services at a lower cost. Finkelstein said the firm's decision to litigate was made due to a lack of confidence in the bodies responsible for revising attorney ethics. In 2015, the United States Court of Appeals for the Second Circuit remanded the firm's previously dismissed challenge, permitting it to amend its complaint to contest additional provisions of New York law, barring non-lawyer investments. Finkelstein was lead plaintiff in the Second Circuit case, Jacoby & Meyers, LLP v. Presiding Justices (2017), and subsequently spoke on alternative business structures for law firms at the American Bar Association's 2018 National Legal Malpractice Conference.

=== eBay stalking lawsuit ===
In May 2024, Finkelstein served as lead attorney for Ina and David Steiner, a Massachusetts couple who sued eBay and former company employees over a 2019 harassment and stalking campaign directed at them in retaliation for their e-commerce newsletter's coverage of the company. The civil suit, filed in 2021, was settled in February 2026 on undisclosed terms shortly before trial.

=== New York State Trial Lawyers Association ===
Finkelstein was sworn in as the 58th president of the New York State Trial Lawyers Association in June 2025, beginning a one-year term on July 1, 2025. During his tenure, NYSTLA supported the passage of New York City's gender-motivated violence protection law and the state's Avoiding Vexatious Overuse of Impleading to Delay (AVOID) Act. In January 2026, Finkelstein publicly opposed Governor Kathy Hochul's proposals to lower automobile insurance rates, which the association argued would reduce compensation available to injured plaintiffs.

== Publications ==
- Finkelstein, Andrew; Lunham, Sarah (2022). I Hope We Never Meet: Client Stories of Tragedy, Recovery, and Accountability from a Life in Deterrence Law. Lioncrest Publishing. ISBN 978-1544524030
