= Jacoby & Meyers =

American law firm

- Headquarters: Los Angeles, California
- No. of offices: 130+
- No. of attorneys: 300+
- Major practice areas: Personal injury, product liability, etc.
- Date founded: 1972; 54 years ago
- Founder: Leonard Jacoby; Stephen Meyers
- Company type: Partnership (United States)
- Website: Company website

Jacoby & Meyers is an American law firm established as a partnership by Leonard Jacoby (1942–2026) and Stephen Meyers (1943–1996). They were pioneers of television advertising campaigns to build exposure and awareness of the firm, growing from a single storefront to as many as 150 offices in Arizona, California, Connecticut, New Jersey, New York, and Pennsylvania. It now has more than 300 attorneys practicing law in all 50 states.

== History ==
The firm was founded in September 1972 by Len Jacoby and Steve Meyers (who had met as students at UCLA School of Law); its first office was a storefront in the Van Nuys section of Los Angeles. During the 1980s, the firm rode a wave of television advertising, expanding to 150 offices, mostly in the Southwest and Northeast. With a strategy that focused on serving "middle-class individuals", Jacoby & Meyers offered free consultations and flat fees for standard cases. The local stores were staffed by general practitioners who used a company-developed system for filing and tracking each case, which could then be referred to specialized units that focused on areas such as bankruptcy, consumer law, criminal law, divorce law, and personal injury law. The firm had garnered much publicity for itself after holding an open house for the media at their offices, which the State Bar of California deemed to be a form of advertising in breach of its code of ethics. After the U.S. Supreme Court overturned restrictions on legal advertising in the United States in the 1977 case Bates v. State Bar of Arizona, Jacoby & Meyers placed their first print ad in the Los Angeles Times the following day and aired their first television commercials within days, making it the first U.S. law firm to advertise on television.

Following the firm's formation, the legal community faced a market saturated with lawyers and law firms that adopted many of Jacoby & Meyers' innovations, accepting credit card payments, charging flat fees, and using computer systems to track cases. By 2010 the firm's television advertising spending exceeded $10 million per year. The firm had products that focused on personal injury, mass torts (pharmaceutical litigation) where litigation was more lucrative, product liability, consumer legal services and legal forms, but began expanding its practice in bankruptcy, Social Security, and criminal defense.

Steve Meyers died in a car collision in New Fairfield, Connecticut, on April 19, 1996, at the age of 53. Gail Koff, who helped establish a New York City office and develop a presence in the Northeastern United States, died from complications from leukemia in Manhattan, New York, on August 31, 2010, at the age of 65.

In October 2012 the firm "began selling online legal forms" as one of the first law firms to follow in the footsteps of "no-frills" legal startups such as LegalZoom and Rocket Lawyer. In 2011, Jacoby & Meyers challenged the constitutionality of R.B.C 5.4, New Jersey's ban on non-lawyer ownership of a law firm. In 2014, Jacoby & Meyers voluntarily dismissed the case.

At the 2022 Golden Gavel Awards, the firm's founder Len Jacoby became the first person inducted into the National Trial Lawyers Advertising Hall of Fame. Also in 2022, Jacoby & Meyers partnered with the Los Angeles Dodgers to host a backpack and school supplies giveaway at Dodger Stadium. Len Jacoby died on January 11, 2026, at the age of 83.

== In popular culture ==
The 1989 Beastie Boys rap song "Shadrach" contains the lyrical line "I got more suits than Jacoby & Meyers."

== See also ==
- Bates v. State Bar of Arizona (1977)
- Legal advertising in the United States
