= Peter Lenz =

American motorcycle racer

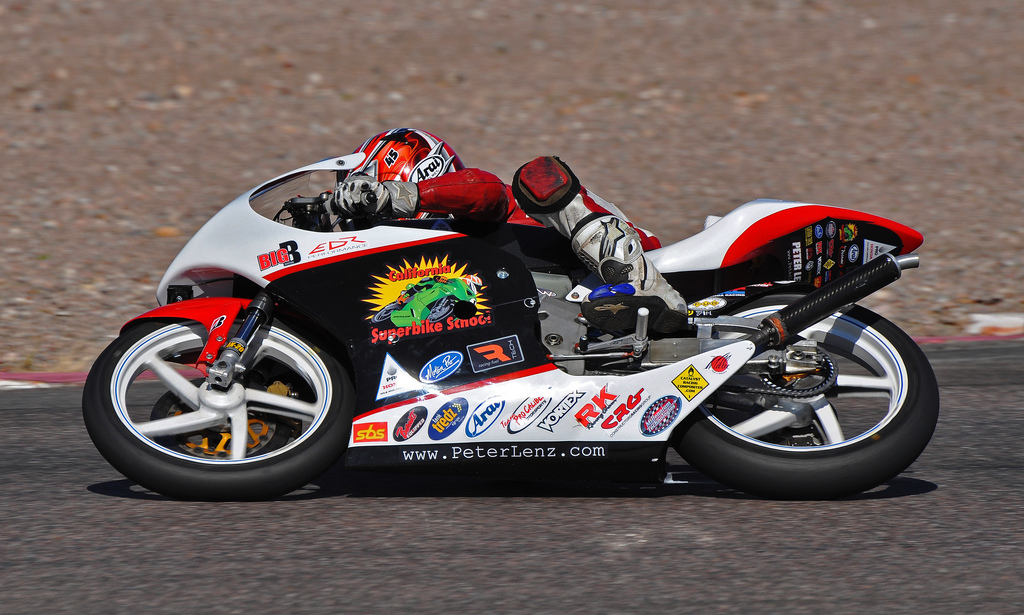
Lenz at Firebird International Raceway on February 28, 2009.

Peter James Lenz (May 30, 1997 – August 29, 2010) was a nationally ranked American amateur motorcycle racer. Born in Winter Park, Florida, he was a four-time international champion, five-time national champion and in 2009 started competing in 125GP racing. He was featured in Roadracing World's 2009 and 2010 Young Guns: North America's Fastest Kids feature.

On August 29, 2010, Lenz died in an accident during the warmup lap of the United States Grand Prix Riders Union race during the Red Bull Indianapolis GP, the youngest competitor to be killed during an Indianapolis Motor Speedway race. To date, he is the last person to have died at Indianapolis Motor Speedway.

== Grand Prix racing ==
In 2009, Lenz began racing full-time on 125 GP race bikes. He competed in the USGPRU National Series and select WERA West, AFM, CCS SW and OMRRA races.

At the age of 11, Lenz became the youngest licensed Expert racer in AFM (American Federation of Motorcyclists) history; the previous holder of that honor was American GP racer Randy Mamola. Lenz also became the youngest rider to win an AFM race with his win in the Clubman Lightweight class on March 21, 2009, at Buttonwillow Raceway Park. Lenz was 11 years, 9 months, and 21 days old.

At the age of 11, Lenz became the youngest licensed Expert racer in CCS (Championship Cup Series) history. He also became the youngest rider to win a CCS race with his win in the 125GP class on March 1, 2009, at Firebird International Raceway (East Course). In the same day, Lenz set a new 125GP track record of 59.14s.

After the first two rounds, Lenz was leading the USGPRU (United States Grand Prix Racers Union) West Coast 125GP and 250GP class championships. Mid-season Lenz crashed into a tire wall at Portland International Raceway (PIR) on May 31, 2009, due to mechanical failures. The accident effectively ended Lenz's 2009 season and his run at the USGPRU 125GP and 250GP motorcycle road racing national championships. Lenz recovered and returned to racing in 2010.

== Career ==
Lenz began riding in the dirt on a Yamaha PW50 when he was five and quickly started racing it. He soon moved up to a KTM Pro Senior 50. At the age of seven, he transitioned to pocketbikes on pavement which he rode for the next two years, finishing with an undefeated season. Lenz then advanced to racing minis for three years on a variety of bikes including: Honda NSR50, KTM 65SX roadracer, Metrakit MiniGP 50 and 80 and Honda RSF150R.

=== 2005 ===
2005 was Lenz's first season riding pocketbikes as well as being a member of the BMS Factory Racing, USA Team. He finished the season taking fourth overall in the Junior division of OMRRA (Oregon Motorcycle Road Racing Association).

=== 2006 ===
In 2006, Lenz rode a full season with OMRRA and joined Portland, Oregon, based FNB Racing. In March, he traveled to France, to visit the BMS factory, and Spain where he placed fourth and sixth in an internationally attended pocketbike race. At the Canadian Mini Nationals sanctioned by the CMA in August at Quesnel, British Columbia, Lenz went home as the 2006 CMA Canadian National Open Pocketbike Champion and the Canadian Junior National Pocketbike Champion. Lenz also raced his first year in MiniGP on his NSR50 finishing as the NMRRA Mini50 GP Class Champion. Lenz completed the season as the OMRRA Junior Overall Pocketbike Champion and announced his retirement from pocketbikes.

=== 2007 ===
In 2007, Lenz rode undefeated in the 50cc classes for the Metrakit Canada Factory team on a Metrakit 50 with ambitions of winning several Canadian National titles. However, a startline crash resulted in a broken arm, taking Lenz out of the series and along with it, his ride with Metrakit. He finished the year aboard his Honda NSR50 and his KTM 65SX motard racer taking a total of four national wins, 34 regional wins, and an additional 14 podiums for the season.

=== 2008 ===
In 2008, Lenz focused on full-size GP chassis bikes. The focus of his riding was to continue the development of his racecraft on MiniGP tracks on his Honda NSR50, KTM 65SX, and new Honda RS85 and Honda RSF150R in select SCMINIGP, CMA CNMRA, CMRRA, NMRRA and SMRRC races. He also ran the Can-Am Mini Motorcycle Roadracing Championship Series in which he won four National Champion titles. He also won the CMA Canadian National Formula Thunder Championship. Awareness of Lenz increased significantly when a video of him titled, "Follow 10yr roadracer Peter Lenz at the Streets of Willow" was posted on YouTube and was viewed and shared by many. Lenz's Honda RSF150R was featured in RoadRacerX's The Point feature. Lenz began riding a Honda RS125 in the fall of 2008 and retired from mini racing on kart tracks. He raced his RS125 for the first time with WERA at Las Vegas Motor Speedway finishing in second place, five tenths of a second off the track record. Lenz was also awarded one of CMA's MAX Awards for the year.

== Coaching ==
The California Superbike School sponsored Lenz. Lenz said that the school and its founder, Keith Code, were instrumental in his success as a racer.

== Personal life ==
Lenz lived with his parents and two sisters in Vancouver, Washington. Lenz trained by running, playing motorcycle video games and riding motocross. In his spare time he enjoyed ripstiking, cycling and video games.

== Crashes ==
On July 8, 2007, Lenz was racing at the Canadian Mini Road Race Formula 80GP when another rider accidentally bumped his handle bar forcing him into a hard right turn and into several other riders. Peter suffered a fractured arm.

On May 31, 2009, Lenz suffered a brake failure and hit tire barriers at the Portland International Raceway (PIR). He suffered several broken bones (tibia and fibula just above the boot line; a broken femur; and a broken humerus just above the elbow) requiring several surgeries. The arm also suffered a severed radial nerve.

== Death ==
On August 29, 2010, Lenz was involved in a fatal crash during a warm-up lap at the MD250H race of the Red Bull Indianapolis GP at the exit of Turn 4 (the exit of the Snake Pit section). Lenz raised his hands up to signal a rider was down, and a pack of three riders came up to him, but the last of the three, 12-year-old Xavier Zayat could not see Lenz, and the two collided. Paramedics immediately placed Lenz into a cervical collar, intubated him, performed cardiopulmonary resuscitation and rushed him to the Methodist Hospital of Indianapolis, where he was later pronounced dead, due to his injuries. Cause of death was determined to be a broken neck. The brain stem injury is common referred to an "internal decapitation". He was the youngest competitor, and the first motorcycle racing death in the circuit's history. Reigning MotoGP World Champion Valentino Rossi fell four times at the track during practice and warm-ups and other top riders acknowledged the track surface and conditions were difficult.

The funeral was held on September 3, 2010, at St. Joseph Catholic Church in Vancouver, Washington. In memory of Lenz, his school (St. Joseph's Catholic School in Vancouver, Washington) is raising funds to build the Peter Lenz Memorial Athletic Field.

Lenz is buried at Mother Joseph Catholic Cemetery in Vancouver, Washington.
