= Ali Abdi (engineer) =

Professor of Electrical and Computer Engineering

Ali Abdi is a professor of Electrical and Computer Engineering at the New Jersey Institute of Technology.

In 2019, Abdi was elected as a Fellow of the Institute of Electrical and Electronics Engineers for "contributions to wireless channel modeling and underwater communications".
