= Louis Bastide =

Malian judge and diplomat

Louis Marie Joseph Bastide (22 October 1943 in Ségou – 29 August 2010 in Bamako) was a Malian judge and diplomat who served as the President, or Chief Justice, of the Supreme Court of Mali.

== Biography ==
Born on 22 October 1943 in Ségou, the son of Paul Bastide and Suzanne Diallo, Bastide is educated at a Jesuit school in Bordeaux, France, and at Lycée Terrasson-de-Fougères in Bamako (present-day Lycée Askia-Mohamed). He studies law at the University of Strasbourg, graduating in 1973, and at the French National School for the Judiciary (ENM).

After starting a career in Mali as a judge, he serves as chief of staff of Prime Minister Mamadou Dembélé and then Deputy Director-General of Institut national de la prévoyance sociale (INPS). After some years in the judiciary again, he is First President of the Supreme Court of Mali (Chief Fustice) between July 1991 and June 1999. Among the landmark decisions taken under his tenure is the protection of trade unionists in the public sector.
