= Alberto Müller Rojas =

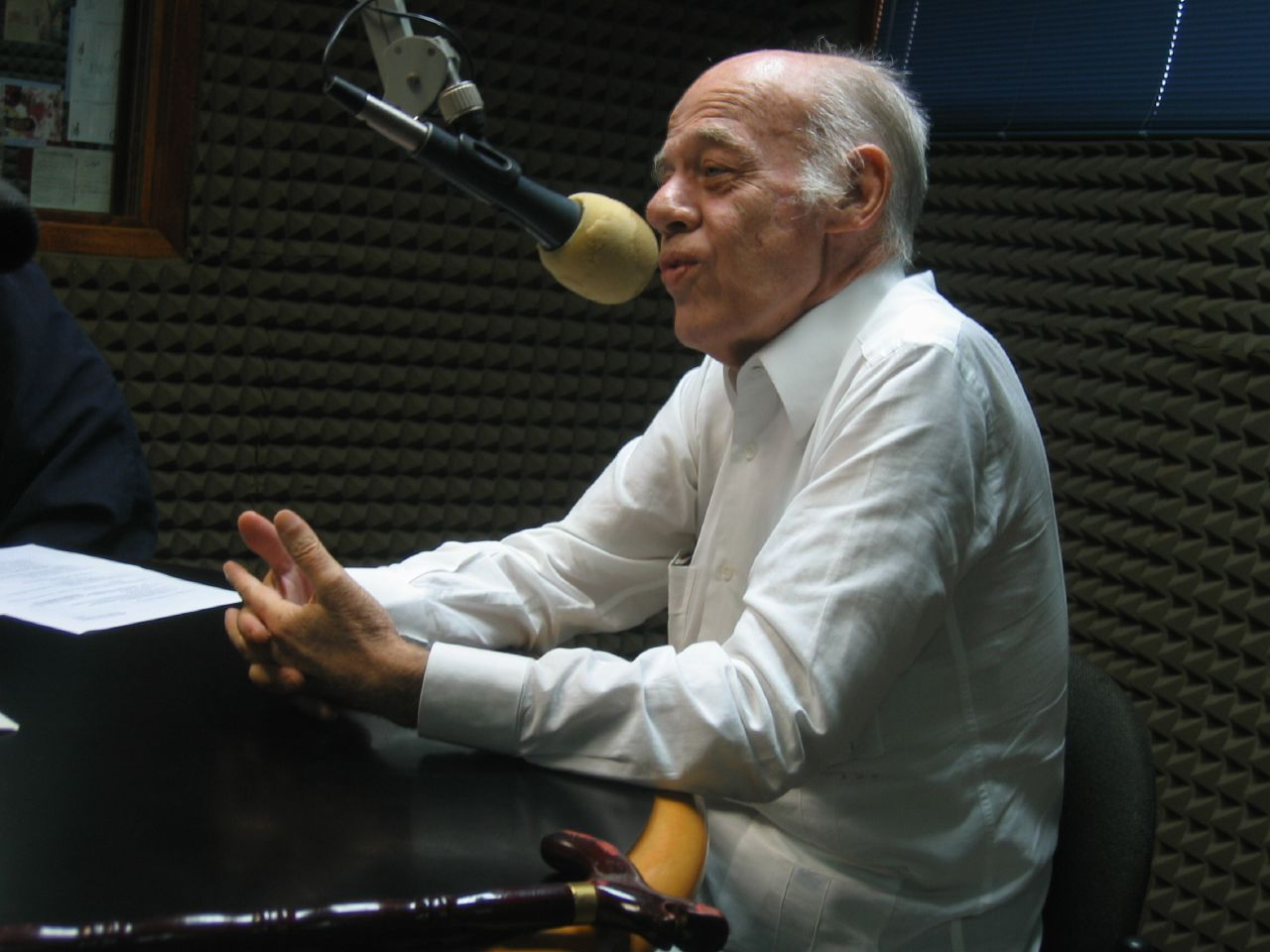
Alberto Müller Rojas

Alberto Müller Rojas (August 9, 1935, Táchira, Venezuela – August 13, 2010, Caracas, Venezuela) was a Venezuelan politician and general. He was once the vice president of the PSUV (United Socialist Party of Venezuela).

Müller Rojas enter the Military Academy at the age of 15. Then in 1978, he was promoted to Major General of the Army and was also appointed Secretary of the Permanent Council on Security and Defence. He taught at Universidad Central de Venezuela and Universidad Simon Bolivar, both of which are in Caracas.
