= James C. Keck =

American physicist

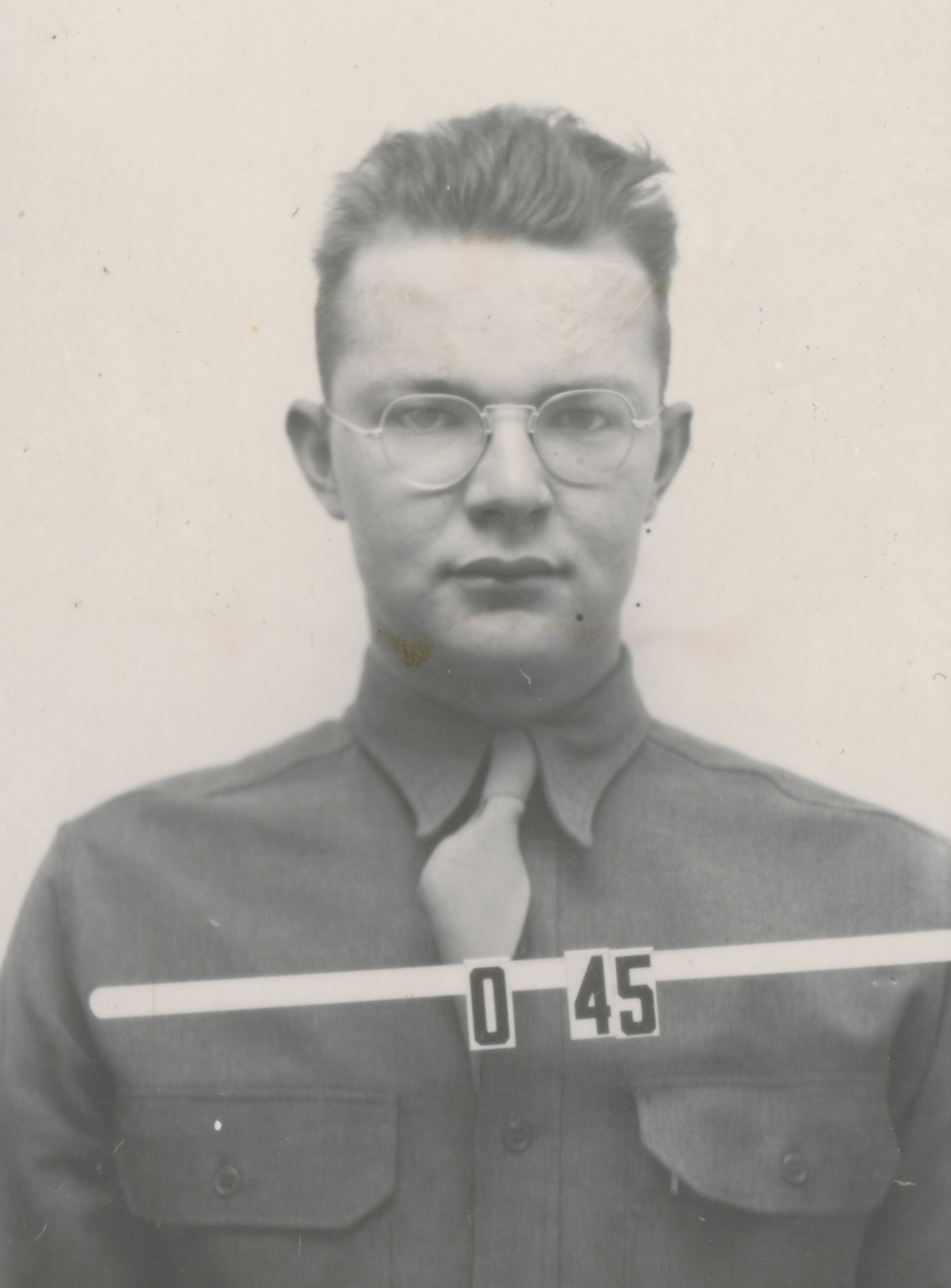
James C. Keck's Los Alamos badge

James Collyer Keck (June 11, 1924 – August 9, 2010) was an American physicist and engineer recognized for his work on the Manhattan Project and for developing new methods for combustion engine modeling and high temperature flows. Keck was the Ford Professor of Engineering at Massachusetts Institute of Technology and a member of the National Academy of Engineering (elected in 2002 "for developing innovative, widely used new concepts for modeling coupled chemical and physical phenomena in engine combustion and high temperature flows").

== Biography ==
James C. Keck graduated from Carmel High School in Carmel, New York, in 1942 and then went to Cornell University where he majored in physics and minored in mathematics. An outstanding student in physics, in 1944 he was drafted into the Special Engineering Detachment of the U.S. Army, given the rank of technical sergeant, and sent to Los Alamos to work on the atomic bomb project as part of the Manhattan Project. Keck left Los Alamos in 1946 and returned to Cornell to complete his studies in nuclear physics, receiving his B.S. in 1947 and his Ph.D. in 1951. He completed his Ph.D. under supervision of Robert R. Wilson. His early interests included high-energy particle physics: Keck carried out pioneering research in photo-nuclear reactions and in spectral radiation from high-temperature shock-heated air.

In 1952, after serving as a research associate at Cornell University, Keck left for the California Institute of Technology, where he served as a research fellow until 1955. That year, he joined the Avco Everett Research Laboratory, where he researched the reentry of missiles and spacecraft into the atmosphere. At the time of his departure from AERL in 1965, he served as its deputy director.

In 1965, Keck joined the faculty of the Massachusetts Institute of Technology, where he began researching the problem of burning rates and pollutant formation in internal combustion engines. His experiments and theoretical studies showed many things about such engines: how nitric oxide is formed in them, the nature of turbulent flame propagation, and the nature of Engine knock. His work is widely used in the automotive industry in the design of efficient and clean engines.

After retiring from MIT, Keck advised graduate students at Northeastern University.

== Personal life ==
At Los Alamos he met another physicist, Margaret Ramsey, who joined the Manhattan Project in 1945. She also left the project in 1946 and went to Indiana University to pursue a master's degree, which she completed while working in physics at Cornell University. She and Keck were married in 1947. They both were employed in the physics department at Cornell through 1952.

They have one son, Robert, a senior scientist at the Laboratory of Laser Energetics at the University of Rochester and one daughter, Pat, a sculptor.
