= Antonio Subirana =

Spanish water polo player (1932–2010)

Personal information
- Nationality: Spanish
- Born: 1 May 1932; Barcelona, Spain
- Died: 3 August 2010 (aged 78); Barcelona, Spain

Sport
- Sport: Water polo

Antonio Subirana (1 May 1932 – 3 August 2010) was a Spanish water polo player. He competed in the men's tournament at the 1952 Summer Olympics.
