= Frank C. Garland =

American epidemiologist

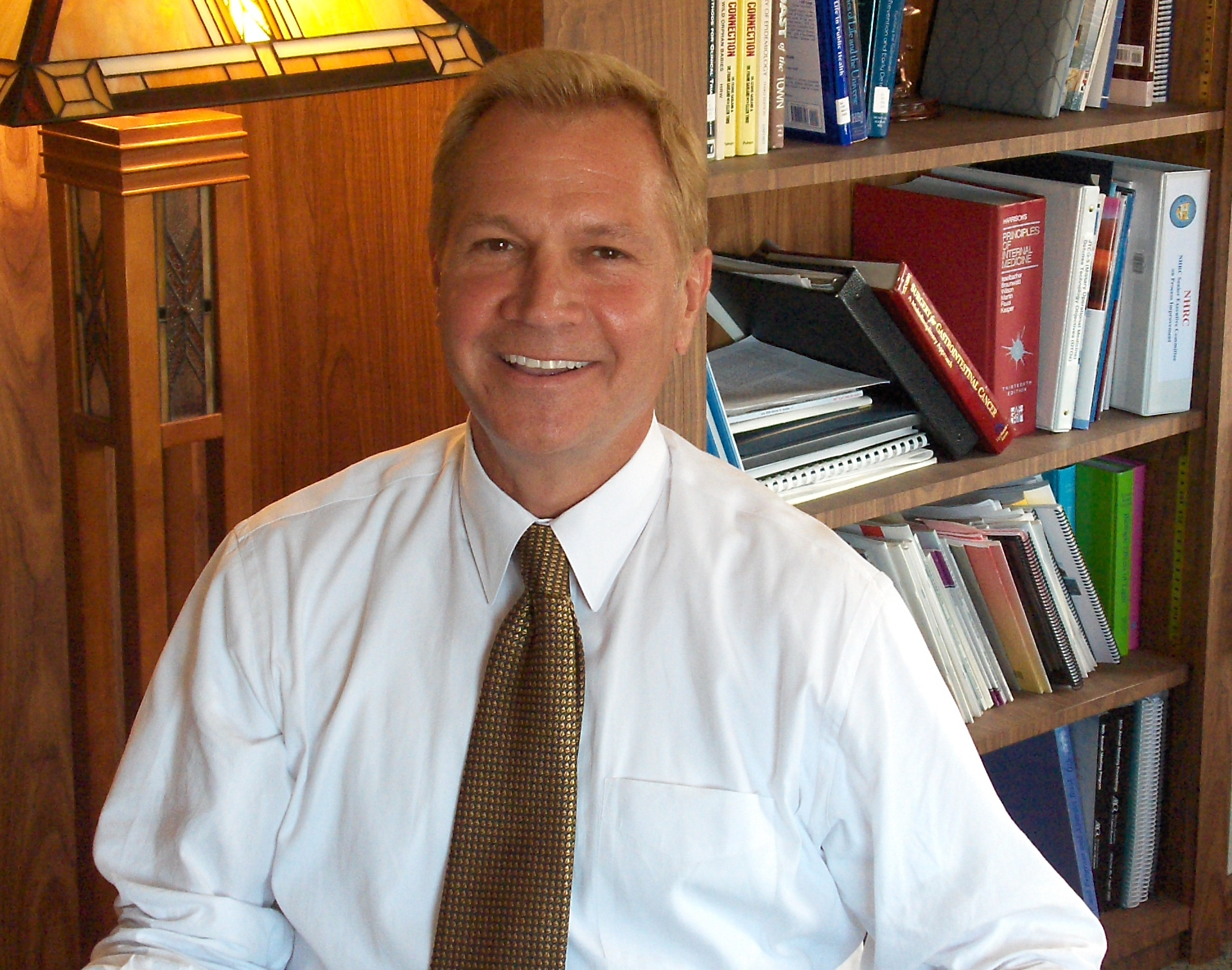
- Dr Frank Garland
- Born: June 20, 1950; San Diego, California
- Died: August 17, 2010 (aged 60); La Jolla, San Diego, California
- Education: Johns Hopkins University
- Scientific career
- Fields: Epidemiology
- Workplaces: University of California, San Diego

Frank Caldwell Garland (June 20, 1950 – August 17, 2010) was an American epidemiologist whose research led to the conclusion that vitamin D deficiency can be a factor increasing risk for breast cancer and colon cancer.

== Biography ==
Garland was born on June 20, 1950, in San Diego and earned a bachelor's degree in 1972 from the University of California, Los Angeles, where he majored in history.

In July 1974, Garland and his brother, epidemiologist Cedric F. Garland, attended a lecture at Johns Hopkins University where maps were presented showing higher rates for certain cancers in counties in the Northern United States, approaching double the rate in some Northern U.S. counties than in the South. This disparity led them to investigate the relationship and write the 1980 article Do Sunlight and Vitamin D Reduce the Likelihood of Colon Cancer? published in the International Journal of Epidemiology, in which the brothers put forth the hypothesis that higher rates of colon cancer in Northerners was caused by lower levels of sunlight exposure, which resulted in lower levels of vitamin D production in the skin and lower levels of circulating 25-hydroxy vitamin D (also known as calcidiol and 25-hydroxycholecalciferol.

Garland recalled, "When my brother, Cedric, and I looked at one of the first maps produced by the National Cancer Institute of colon cancer incidence rates in the United States, we both immediately noticed a pattern, a distinct North-South gradient in incidence. This pattern changed our professional research careers. Our entire academic lives are based on that single moment." While recognizing the risk of melanoma and other forms of skin cancer from excessive exposure to the Sun, the Garlands proposed that limited sun exposure would provide enough vitamin D to help prevent colon cancer, which could also be achieved by taking nutritional supplements.

== Education and early career ==
Garland was awarded a doctorate in 1981 from Johns Hopkins University and pursued a career as an epidemiologist at the University of California, San Diego, where he was hired in 1986 as professor of family and preventive medicine.

== Published work ==
His later research connected deficiencies in vitamin D in residents of Northern cities with chronic disease outcomes including type 1 diabetes and higher incidence rates of breast cancer and other cancers. Another of their studies which analyzed the blood from 25,000 volunteers from Washington County, Maryland found that those with the highest levels of the vitamin D metabolite calcifediol had a risk of colon cancer that was one-fifth of typical rates. In a study of residents of Chicago conducted over two decades, the Garlands found that the colon cancer incidence in the quintile with the highest vitamin D intake was half that of those in the lowest quintile. Theirs was the first study to show that higher levels of vitamin D could cut rates of colon cancer.

Garland co-authored two books with Frank Garland, The Calcium Connection (1988) and The Calcium Diet (1990).

== Personal life ==
A resident of San Diego, Garland died at age 60 on August 17, 2010, at Thornton Hospital in La Jolla, San Diego, California, due to cancer of the esophageal junction.
