= Ron Allen (playwright) =

African-American poet and playwright

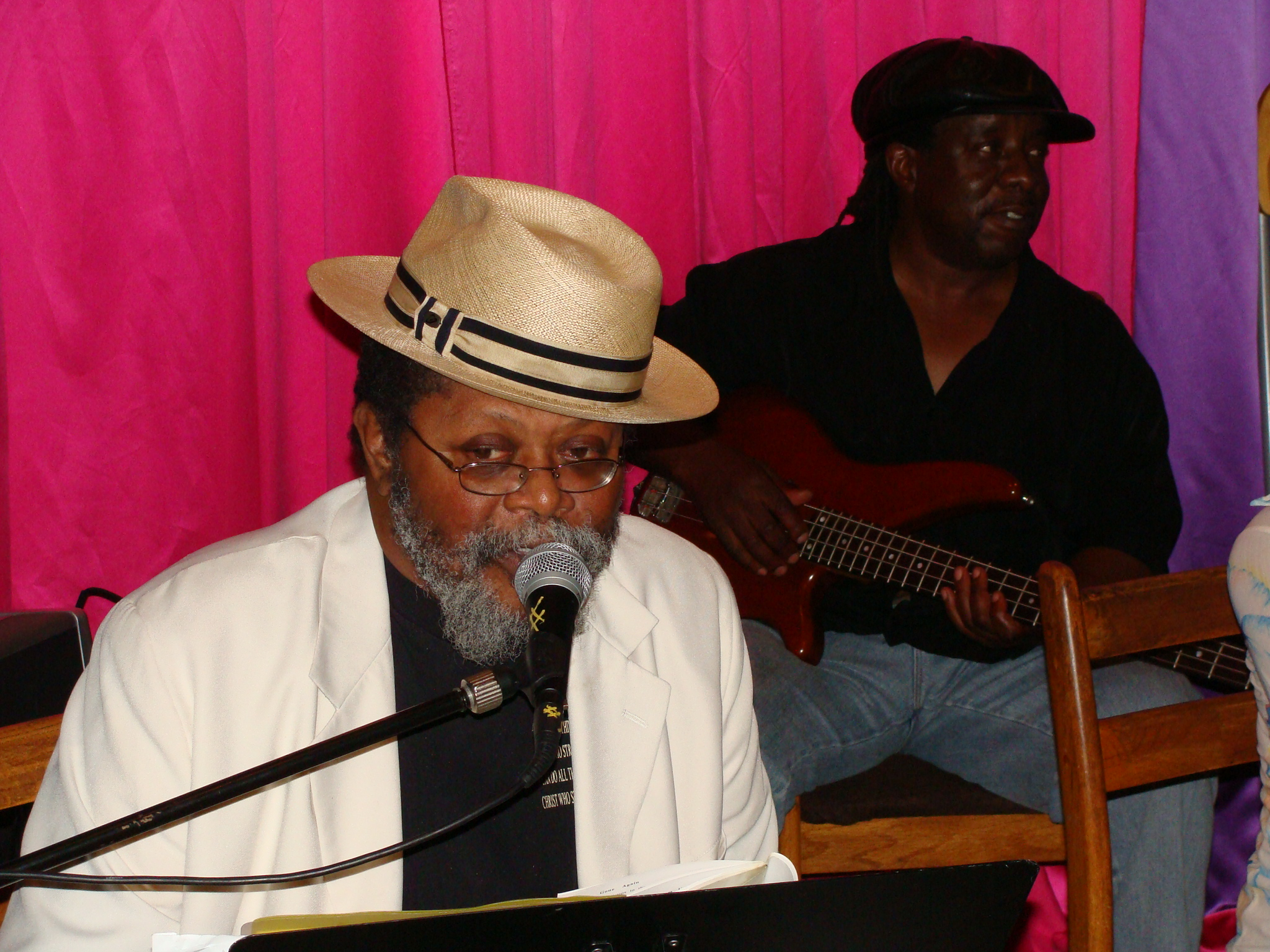
- Ron Allen performing with Code Zero in Los Angeles, 2009
- Born: Ronald Allen; September 13, 1947; Detroit, Michigan U.S
- Died: August 10, 2010 (aged 62); Los Angeles, California U.S.
- Occupations: Poet; playwright; teacher

Ronald "Ron" Allen (September 13, 1947 – August 10, 2010) was an American poet and playwright associated with Detroit's Cass Corridor arts scene. An Army veteran of the Vietnam era, he co-founded the Horizons in Poetry (H.I.P.) series in the early 1980s and became known for experimental theater pieces that fused poetic language, music, and performance. He relocated to Los Angeles in 2007, where he continued staging new work and performed with the jazz-poetry band Code Zero.

== Artistic philosophy ==
In a 2009 interview, Ron Allen described his artistic philosophy:

“My work is an exploration and expression of the abstract and physical nature of reality. Language or written text is the force that poetically drives the plot, character, and direction of my work. I use metaphor and trope to create landscapes of defamilarized environments and conditions that affect human consciousness.

“I attempt to walk the radical edge of meaning and theatricality in an assault on conditioned response in behavior and thinking in our culture. I am a critic of the norms that restrict innovation and restrict the search for freedom of ideas as a human imperative.

“My characters are social paradigms and objectified patterns of historical class and power. The point is the search for truth as undefined as that may be, but truth as realization on the scale of impersonal triumph and the struggle of more questions.

“The issue of race which I define as the ongoing muck of American culture is the center of much of my work. I strive to explore what it means to be black in an upside-down world – a world that makes the struggle for identity and power a radical act.”

== Career ==
=== Detroit ===
Allen emerged as a prominent voice within Detroit's Cass Corridor community in the 1970s–1990s, mentoring younger writers and organizing readings. He was a co-founder of the H.I.P. (Horizons in Poetry) series in the early 1980s and developed “mind-stretching” theater pieces while sustaining an active presence in the city's poetry venues. His Detroit-rooted work and community organizing are frequently cited by peers and later chroniclers of the Corridor scene.

=== Los Angeles ===
After moving to Los Angeles in 2007, Allen continued to write and stage new works and also performed with the band Code Zero. His play My Eyes Are the Cage in My Head was produced by the Los Angeles Poverty Department (LAPD); the piece explores the effects of colonization and recurring behaviors through a poetics-driven theatrical idiom. LAPD also developed Allen's performance project Fried Poetry.

Allen published four books of critically acclaimed poetry, including I Want My Body Back and Neon Jawbone Riot. He released a book of poetry in 2008 titled The Inkblot Theory. He was founder and director of Weightless Language Press. He taught poetry and theater for 13 years in the drug recovery community in Detroit. He also taught poetry and meditation in an assisted-living facility in Inglewood, California.

Ron Allen died August 10, 2010, in Los Angeles.

== Legacy ==
A Detroit-based group of collaborators launched the Ron Allen Project, a memorial documentary and multi-media initiative to preserve Allen's life and work through film, interviews, and readings. In Los Angeles, the Los Angeles Poverty Department and Dramastage-Qumran sponsor the Ron Allen FRIED POETRY Prize, honoring his creative practice and encouraging new poetic work; associated activities have included public workshops and readings at the Skid Row History Museum & Archive.

== Selected stage works ==
- My Eyes Are the Cage in My Head — produced by the Los Angeles Poverty Department (LAPD).
- Fried Poetry — performance project developed with LAPD.
