= Ali Abdi (activist) =

Iranian human and women rights activist

- علی عبدی
- Born: 21 April 1985 (age 41); Isfahan, Iran
- Education: Sharif University of Technology (BS), Yale University (PhD)
- Known for: Human right activism

Ali Abdi (born 21 April 1985, Persian: علی عبدی) is an Iranian human and women rights activist, political prisoner, and former student activist at Sharif University of Technology.

In Feb 2024, he was sentenced to total of 12 years in prison. He was sentenced to six years in prison for articles he wrote a decade earlier about gender and sexual minorities, five years in prison for protesting the announced results of the 2009 presidential election, and one year in prison for “propaganda against the regime”. His sentence was upheld by the Court of Appeals.

== Activism ==
Abdi took part in the 2006 One Million Signatures women's rights campaign.

In 2009, Abdi was a participant in the Iranian Green Movement while a student at Sharif University of Technology in Tehran. He was able to avoid arrest, and in September he left Iran after obtaining a student visa.

After completing his Ph.D. at Yale, Abdi moved to Brooklyn, New York City. While living outside of Iran, Abdi continued to remain involved in activism. In New York, he worked on campaigns allowing for medicine to be imported into Iran, as well as campaigns opposing sanctions on Iran due to their humanitarian cost. Online, he continued to remain active on Iranian social media. In 2013, Abdi received political asylum in the United States.

In 2017, Abdi opposed further restrictions on the United States' Visa Waiver Program, fearing they would punish Iranian citizens for the actions of their government.

== 2023 arrest ==
After 14 years in exile living in USA, EU and Afghanistan, Abdi returned to Iran in June 2023 and was arrested in November 2023.

He is currently imprisoned in Tehran’s Evin prison, controlled by the IRGC's intelligence agents, and faces serious health issues, including the risk of losing his eyesight due to inadequate medical care. The specifics of the charges against him remain unclear.

== Personal life and education ==
He finished his Bsc in mechanical engineering in 2008 from Sharif University of Technology which is considered Iran's MIT and the country most prestigious university. He moved to EU for graduate study and earned a master's degree in gender studies at a school in Budapest, and a Ph.D. in anthropology from Yale University. Abdi traveled to Afghanistan in January 2017 to work on his doctoral thesis; he was subsequently impacted by Executive Order 13769 and subsequent executive orders that restricted Iranian nationals from entering the United States.

In 2021, while in Afghanistan as part of his PhD studies in anthropology at Yale University, Abdi was captured by Taliban in Bamyan during Talban take over of Afghanistan. He was released after 2 weeks.

After completing his release, he moved to Turkey to finish his PhD. After losing sight in his right eye, he chose to return to Iran to be with his family. While at the Iranian Embassy in Ankara to renew his passport, he underwent a 4-hour security interview about his past. Despite this, he was granted entry, issued a new passport, and went to Isfahan, Iran. About a month later, he was arrested and charged.
