= Gail Koff =

American lawyer

- Born: Gail Joanne Koff; May 15, 1945; Manhattan, New York, U.S.
- Died: August 31, 2010 (aged 65); Manhattan, New York, U.S.
- Education: University of California, Berkeley (BA); George Washington University (JD)
- Occupation: Attorney
- Children: 3

Gail Joanne Koff (May 15, 1945 – August 31, 2010) was an American lawyer who became one of the lead partners in the law firm of Jacoby & Meyers, for which she helped establish a New York City office and develop a presence in the Northeastern United States.

== Life ==
Koff was born in Manhattan on May 15, 1945, and was raised in Scarsdale, New York, as a self-described "child of the 60s". She earned her B.A. degree in 1966 from the University of California, Berkeley. She earned her J.D. degree in 1969 from George Washington University Law School and worked for the Office of Economic Opportunity in the Legal Services Administration while she was still in school. She recounted being harassed as one of the law school's few female students, including an incident in which a professor told the class "'Miss Koff, would you please stand up so we can all see the dimensions of this case?" She was hired by the law firm Skadden, Arps, Slate, Meagher & Flom after graduating from law school.

Saying that "my main interest in the law has always been the availability of local services", she became a partner in the law firm of Jacoby & Meyers in 1979, which had been founded in California in 1972 to offer low-priced legal services to middle class clients, featuring such innovations as flat fees, acceptance of credit card payments and computerized tracking of cases. The firm became the first to advertise on television after a 1977 U.S. Supreme Court ruling overturned restrictions on advertising by attorneys. Koff had the responsibility of opening a New York office for the firm. She held a 20% stake in the firm, but was called a "silent partner" by The New York Times by staying out of the limelight occupied by the two founding partners, though she did appear holding a hair dryer in one of the firm's TV advertisements warning consumers of the risks of fraud and injury, and appeared in some of the firm's commercials throughout the 1990s and most of the early 2000s. A disagreement between the partners over the management of the firm led to a split, with Jacoby maintaining control of the firm's California offices while Koff and Meyers held onto all of the other locations.

Koff was the author of the 1985 book The Jacoby & Meyers Practical Guide to Everyday Law and the 1991 Jacoby & Meyers Guide to Divorce, as well as The Jacoby & Meyers Practical Guide to Personal Injury and Love and the Law. She also wrote a weekly legal advice column and hosted a weekly radio show called "The Law and You".

In June 2010, Koff was awarded the Highest Leaf Award by the Women’s Venture Fund. In addition, she was honored by the National Association of Women Business Owners in 2007 and received the Civic Spirit Award from the Women’s City Club of New York in 2002. Working Woman magazine named Jacoby & Meyers in their Top 500 Women-Owned Businesses of 1998 and the New York Law Journal recognized Koff as one of the most influential lawyers in America.

Koff was a charter member of The Committee of 200, a group of women entrepreneurs. She was also a member of the Education Committees for the International Women's Forum, the Museum of Modern Art and Thirteen (WNET). For two decades Ms. Koff was a trustee and general counsel of Bank Street College, where her three children attended school. She was, in addition, an advisor to the Success Academy Charter Schools (then known as the Harlem Success Academy charter school) and a board member of the Calhoun School, and the Newark Educators' Community Charter School. She was a Director of Africare and a member of the New York State Bar Association. In 2008, she was selected to the top 100 trial lawyers within the American Trial Lawyers Association.

Koff was the subject of a bitter divorce battle after her 20-year marriage to Ralph Brill ended. Ultimately the prenuptial agreement they signed in 1978 was invalidated and Koff was granted a 65% share of marital assets based on her greater involvement in running the household and working on a full-time basis. "The evidence unquestionably establishes that the wife undertook the herculean combined roles of full-time lawyer, primary homemaker and primary parent of the three children."

== Death ==
Koff died at age 65 on August 31, 2010, in Manhattan. The cause of her death was complications associated with her most recent procedure to treat chronic lymphocytic leukemia. She was survived by a son and two daughters.
