= Robert Gundlach =

American physicist (1926–2010)

Robert W. Gundlach
- Born: September 7, 1926; Buffalo, New York, U.S.
- Died: August 18, 2010 (aged 83); Rochester, New York
- Education: University at Buffalo
- Known for: Inventor of the modern photocopier
- Awards: National Inventors Hall of Fame (inducted in 2005)
- Scientific career
- Fields: Physics
- Workplaces: Xerox Corporation

Robert W. Gundlach (September 7, 1926 – August 18, 2010) was an American physicist. He is most noted for his prolific contributions to the field of xerography, specifically the development of the modern photocopier. Gundlach helped transform the Haloid Company, a small photographic firm, into the thriving Xerox Corporation. Over the course of his 42-year career with the company, he contributed over 155 patents, making photocopying technology more affordable and practical. In 1966 Gundlach was named Xerox's first Research Fellow, the highest non-managerial that could be achieved by a Xerox scientist. After his retirement in 1995, he was granted several patents associated with his hobbies, including a snow-making system and a special backpack.

== Biography ==
=== Early years ===
Robert Gundlach was born in 1926 in a small town several miles outside Buffalo. He worked on a farm across the street from his house for twelve and a half cents an hour – a dollar a day for eight hours of work. His father, Emanuel Gundlach, was a chemist responsible for inventing Wildroot Cream-Oil, a hair preparation. Emanuel's first batch of Cream-Oil was rejected by Wildroot executives, but after a few modifications, the invention was a success. Bob spent one summer of his teenage years working for Wildroot, mixing Cream-Oil at a factory in Buffalo. Bob's grandfather was a minister in the German Reformed Church, and preached in German in upstate New York. Emanuel and his family instead became involved with the Quaker-like pacifist organization called the Fellowship of Reconciliation.

=== Education ===
Gundlach attended the University at Buffalo, but was drafted just after the end of World War II following his freshman year. He spent a year in conscientious objector camps, and promptly returned to school. Back at the University at Buffalo, he switched his initial chemistry major to graduate with a physics degree in 1949. Gundlach spent two years in graduate school, but never completed his PhD.

=== Early career ===
Although he was a successful physicist, Gundlach experienced difficulties finding a job due to his pacifistic beliefs. Companies he applied for weren't interested in physicists who did not do war work. He was briefly hired at Durez Plastics and Chemicals, where he worked in the plastic company's physical testing laboratory. In 1952, Gundlach learned from an old University at Buffalo classmate of his that a small photographic firm in Rochester was hiring. He applied for a job with the Haloid Company, and was hired after receiving an exceptional score on a written physics test. After Joe Wilson, the firm's president, promised that work on military projects would never be required, Robert readily accepted the job. He would go on to devote many years of hard work and passion into the company, contributing countless ideas and helping the small firm grow into a corporate giant.

=== Haloid Company ===
The fairly new Haloid Company originally manufactured photographic paper and equipment. When Robert Gundlach joined, he discovered that much of their xerographic research was accident based. Instead of working in a modern laboratory, Gundlach experimented in the cramped attic of an old house in a working-class neighborhood. There were very few titles and little organizational structure within the physicists. Gundlach made his impact within the company quickly, coming up with three patentable ideas in his first year with Haloid. Before Robert joined the company, xerography was good at copying thin lines and characters, but could not successfully reproduce large, solid black areas. Solid areas came out looking washed-out because of a difference in electric potential between exposed and unexposed surface areas on a photoreceptor. Along edges, the potential difference was high and allowed excellent image reproduction, but in solid areas, the low potential difference caused faded images. Gundlach invented the Tone Tray, a grounded metal plate placed directly above the photoreceptor to create a constant potential difference between the plate and every part of an image. This invention alone brought the company enough profits in one year to pay all the salaries in the physics department.

Gundlach continued his research and experimentation in the field of xerography, developing a process that allowed many copies to be produced from a single image. Early photocopiers were slow and impractical, requiring several minutes to copy and reproduce a single document. Gunchlach's process significantly increased the speed of the photocopier and paved the way for its commercial success.

In 1955, Haloid transformed its photo-paper warehouses into showrooms for its Xerox machines and hired several hundred sales and service people. In 1956, the president of the company formed an overseas partnership with a British film company called the Rank Organization. This partnership would become Rank Xerox, expanding the market of photocopiers overseas to Europe. In 1960, the Xerox 914 copier was introduced to the market and became an instant hit, propelling the company to unsurpassed heights.

=== Xerox Corporation ===
The Xerox 914 was the first marketable automatic and plain-paper copier. This machine could produce a good quality copy in under a minute. Although it was large and weighed 650 pounds, businesses had high demand for the efficient copier. Small businesses could lease it on a monthly basis, making xerography affordable to startup companies. The 914 was a huge success, exceeding Haloid's most optimistic projections, and creating a huge market demand for the product. In 1961 Haloid was listed on the New York Stock Exchange and changed its name to the Xerox Corporation. Xerography accounted for most of the company's profits, and photography operations were placed under the new Haloid photo division. The Xerox Corporation expanded internationally, opening subsidiaries in Mexico, continental Europe, Japan, and Australia. By 1968, the Xerox 914 led the company to over $1 billion in sales. With the debut of the 914, Xerox was granted 15-year exclusive patent rights to xerography. These rights, along with millions of dollars spent for product development, allowed Robert Gundach to refine photocopiers undisturbed. He developed more improvements and was quickly promoted within the company. In 1963, Gundlach was one of the company's first four Senior Scientists. In 1966, he was named Xerox's first Research Fellow, and in 1978, he was appointed Senior Research Fellow. One of his most significant inventions was tri-level xerography, a process that allows the printing of two colors in a single pass, achieving perfect registration and greater speed than earlier methods.

=== Later years ===
After his retirement from the Xerox Corporation in 1995, Gundlach concentrated on his hobbies. His house contained a self-invented heating and cooling system which only costs about $600 per year to operate. He also held patents for a shadowless sundial, a snowmaking process, an extremely comfortable backpack, and a cheap 20,000 Volt electrostatic generator. Gundlach continued to invent, and his lifetime contributions were recognized by the National Inventors Hall of Fame when he was inducted in 2005.

Gundlach died on August 18, 2010, from aspiration pneumonia.

== Key patents ==
- Gundlach, U.S. patent 2,968,552, "Xerographic Apparatus and Method"
- Gundlach, U.S. patent 3,738,855, "Induction Imaging System"
- Gundlach, U.S. patent 2,912,586, "Xerographic Charging"
