= Woody Pitney =

- Born: Edward Pitney; Melbourne, Australia
- Genres: Folk, pop
- Occupations: Singer, songwriter
- Instrument: Guitar
- Labels: Universal, Electrola
- Website: woodypitneymusic.com

Woody Pitney is an Australian singer/songwriter, previously signed to Universal Music. His song "You Can Stay" is featured on the weg.de travel commercial in Germany. The positive reception of his song from the advertising campaign led to Pitney charting on the iTunes Singer/Songwriter charts in several European countries while still an independent artist. "You Can Stay" was released by Universal Music / Electrola on 27 June 2014. He released his new single 'A Little Too Late' in June, 2018.
