= Amal al-Moallimi =

Saudi Arabian diplomat

Amal Bint Yahya al-Moallimi is the Saudi Arabian ambassador to Canada. She was previously the Saudi Arabian ambassador to Norway. She is the second Saudi woman ambassador and is the sister of Ambassador Abdallah Yahya al-Mouallimi, the long-standing Permanent Representative of the Kingdom of Saudi Arabia to the United Nations.

== Background and education ==
Amal al-Moallimi has a bachelor's degree in the English Language from Princess Nora bint Abdul Rahman University in Saudi Arabia. She also obtained a graduate degree in Mass Communication and Media from the University of Denver in the United States.

Ambassador al-Moallimi had held the position of the Director General of Organizations and International Cooperation at the Saudi Human Rights Commission (HRC or Commission) since 2019. Prior to this, she was Assistant Secretary-General at Saudi Arabia's King Abdulaziz Center for National Dialogue.

== Al-Moallimi and Loujain al-Hathloul ==
Amal al-Moallimi was one of the members of the Saudi HRC who visited Loujain al-Hathloul, a Saudi Arabian woman human rights activist in prison, on 26 November 2020. During that prison visit, according to al-Hathloul's family, the commission members said they could not help her and there is no evidence that they ever did. And while the Saudi Human Rights Commission's 2019 annual report mentioned receiving complaints about torture and mistreatment, it listed no actions taken to investigate or protect al-Hathloul. A few months later, a representative of the Human Rights Commission spoke to the Saudi media outlet Okaz, and even denied reports of torture and mistreatment in Saudi prisons.

According to Democracy for the Arab World Now (DAWN), an independent non-governmental organization, the refusal of al-Moallimi and her colleagues to investigate al-Hathloul's complaint and take appropriate action violated their obligation under the Saudi Statute governing the commission to “receive and verify complaints related to human rights and take legal measures pertaining to them.” DAWN contacted Amal al-Moallimi and requested a response on the above on October 30, 2020, but did not receive any.
