= Jerry Flint =

American journalist

Jerry Flint (June 20, 1931 – August 7, 2010) was a senior automotive editor for Forbes magazine, continuing as a columnist from his official retirement in 1996 until his death. Flint also wrote articles for a variety of media, including Ward's AutoWorld, with whom he continued until his death from a stroke on August 7, 2010.

== Early life and career ==
Of Polish Jewish descent, Flint was born in a working-class neighborhood in Detroit on June 20, 1931, a time when the Great Depression had sunk so deep he and family would walk miles to the Fisher Theater for a film, hoping to save a few nickels on streetcar fares. He was educated at what was then Detroit's city college but is now Wayne State University. He finally saw the world beyond as an Army intelligence officer stationed in Herzogenaurach, Germany, starting in 1953.

Upon his return, Flint entered journalism. By 1958 he was working first in Chicago and then Detroit for The Wall Street Journal. In 1967 he went to work for The New York Times in Detroit and became Detroit bureau chief. He moved to New York with the Times and remained there until 1979, when he moved to Forbes as Washington bureau chief. Flint returned to New York with Forbes and again covered the auto industry. Retiring from the Forbes editorial staff in 1996, at the age of 65, he continued as a columnist (Backseat Driver) and contributor until his death on August 7, 2010.

Flint won the Gerald Loeb Award for Commentary in 2003. The Journal of Financial Reporting named him one of the 100 most prominent business reporters of the 20th century. Among the honors he was most proud of, however, was being chosen as one of the 40 finalists for NASA's Journalist in Space program. The program was canceled following the explosion that destroyed the shuttle Challenger.

Flint also served as President of the International Motor Press Association.

== Legacy costs insights ==
He was one of the earliest automotive writers to discuss the looming legacy cost crisis for GM and Ford. In this article, Flint proposed the controversial measure of taxing all U.S. auto sales in order to fund legacy healthcare and pension costs for GM, Ford and Chrysler workers. He premised this proposal on the idea that, in bankruptcy, the United States public would have to pay these costs anyway due to the American government's pension guaranty program.
