= Sten Christer Andersson =

Swedish politician (1943–2010)

- In office 1983–2002

Personal details
- Born: Sten Christer Andersson; 28 February 1943 Västra Skrävlinge, Sweden
- Died: 16 September 2010 (aged 67) Fosie, Sweden
- Party: Sweden Democrats (2002-2010); Moderate Party (1983-2002); Swedish Social Democrats (before 1983).
- Occupation: Politician, trade union official

Sten Christer Andersson (28 February 1943 – 16 August 2010) was a Swedish politician and Member of Parliament in the Riksdag.

Andersson was a shipyard worker and trade unionist by profession.

In 1983, Andersson was elected to the Riksdag for the Moderates. In the 1980s, Andersson became known for being outspoken against the immigration policy in Sweden and for his support for the referendum in Sjöbo Municipality which called for a ban on the Municipality accepting any more refugees and led to the refugee controversy in Sjöbo. Due to criticism from within the Moderates, Andersson left the party in 2001 and sat as an independent in the Riksdag. In 2002, he joined the right-wing nationalist Sweden Democrats (SD) party and unsuccessfully ran for the party in the 2002 Swedish general election in which the SD did not get enough votes to qualify for representation. In 2006, he was elected to the municipal council in Malmö for the Sweden Democrats and was the most voted for politician in Malmö after the Mayor Ilmar Reepalu. In the run-up to the 2010 Swedish general election, Andersson again stood for parliament on the Sweden Democrats list in which the SD was successful at entering the Riksdag for the first time, however Andersson was unable to take up his parliamentary seat after he was hospitalized with pneumonia and subsequently died. His former seat on Malmö municipal council was taken over by fellow SD politician Per Ramhorn.
