= Jairo Aníbal Niño =

Colombian writer

- Born: November 5, 1941 Moniquirá, Colombia
- Died: August 30, 2010 (aged 68) Bogotá, Colombia
- Occupation: Writer, poet, playwright, teacher, librarian, screenwriter
- Genre: Children's literature

Jairo Aníbal Niño (September 5, 1941 in Moniquirá (Boyacá) – August 30, 2010 in Bogotá) was a Colombian writer who directed the National Library of Colombia. He started his career as an artist; he tried his hand in painting but turned to playwriting. He is best known in the writing world for his contributions to juvenile literature. Most of his published works were children's literature, to which he dedicated most of his career. Jairo Aníbal Niño was a university professor, director of the National Library of Colombia, screenwriter, director of the playwriting workshop in the Free Theatre of Bogota, and director of the theater department at National University of Colombia in Bogota. He was awarded the Colombian National Literature award (Premio Nacional de Literatura Colombiana) in 1977.

== Biography ==
The renowned writer Jairo Aníbal Niño was born in Boyacá, Colombia in 1941 and died in Bogotá Colombia in 2010. He passed his childhood in Moniquirá, his homeland, from which he immigrated to Bucaramanga because of the dangerous situation in his city after his father was murdered. His vocation was initially as a painter but soon changed to theater, first as an actor and later as a director and playwright. During this time period some of his works that emerged include El monte calvo, los inquilinos de la ira, el golpe de estado, and las bodas de lata, among others. Jairo Aníbal Niño's life can be seen in his work. The landscape, nature, the economy, and the history of Boyacá are his personal stamp. Workers, field laborers, students, the defenseless, and children are among the people he addresses in his works. Most of his works were published by the Panamericana Editorial. He was the director of the National Library of Colombia until 1990. Considered a prolific writer, Jairo Aníbal Niño published various story books and poems for children. Children of all ages consider him a friend. This public figure was supported by "la niña Ire" –Irene Morales-, his wife, and three kids, Santiago, Paula, and Alejandra, to whom he frequently dedicated his work. He died at 68 years old, on August 30, 2010, leaving behind a piece that some critics claim as a paradigm for children's Colombian literature.

== Works ==
- Preguntario 1998
- Razgo, Indo y Saz 1991
- La alegría de querer 1986
- Toda la vida 1979
- Puro pueblo 1977
- Zoro 1977
- El sol subterráneo 1970
- Las bodas de lata 1969
- El baile de los arzobispos 1968
