= Lawyer referral service =

Service to help people find attorneys

A lawyer referral service maintains a network of lawyers, and connects people in need of lawyers with its participating attorneys. A potential client who contacts a lawyer referral service is directed to a lawyer who practices in the area of law that is most appropriate for their situation. Some lawyer referral services charge a fee for providing a referral, while others provide referrals at no cost to the prospective client. Many referral services connect prospective clients with lawyers who have agreed to provide a low-cost or free initial consultation.

- Referral services are often provided by state and local bar associations as a public service.
- Referral services may also be offered by non-profit organizations and advocacy groups.
- For-profit referral services may connect lawyers with clients who pay a membership fee, or a fee for successfully referred clients, subject to rules against sharing fees with non-lawyers.

== Process ==
Historically, lawyer referral services involved prospective clients contacting a bar association or responding to an advertisement, by placing a telephone call to the service and seeking a referral. With the internet boom in the 1990s, many consumers turned to the web to search for goods and services. A research study released in 2012, shows that 76 percent of adult consumers looking for a lawyer used online resources at some point during the search process.

Some referral services provide referrals to lawyers in a broad range of areas of legal practice. Others may focus on referrals within a narrow range of practice areas, or a single practice area.

Online lawyer referral services are sometimes called attorney-client matching services. People who contact a service may be matched with one or more attorneys, based upon such factors as area of legal practice and geographic location. Lawyers who participate in these services may pay a fee for participation, a fee for each referral, or in some cases a percentage of the amount charged to a referred client. In some cases the prospective client will be able to choose from a list of referred attorneys, while in other cases the referral will be made to a specific participating lawyer.

If a client is unable to afford a lawyer and the legal problem is not a matter that can be handled by a lawyer on a percentage fee basis, some referral services may attempt to match the client with a pro bono lawyer, or direct the client to contact a legal aid organization or law student clinic for help.

== Ethics ==
Ethical issues may arise for lawyers who participate in for-profit referral services, and state rules governing participation can vary significantly.

Some referral services are certified by bar associations, including the American Bar Association. Certified referral services must maintain standards of service as defined by the certifying organization. Among those standards, certification may require that participating lawyers meet minimum standards of experience, or maintain legal malpractice insurance.

The American Bar Association provides a list attorney referral services that meet its certification requirements.

== Controversy ==
Some legal associations have expressed concern that lawyer referral services can lead to lawyers trying to undercut each other to get clients, rather than focusing on quality of service and the development of their reputation among their peers.

Another concern about lawyer referral services relates to client confidentiality. When a prospective client contacts a lawyer directly about retaining the lawyer's services, the communication is normally held absolutely confidential under principles of attorney-client privilege. Where a lawyer referral service collects information from a person who is seeking a lawyer, that information will not normally be confidential, raising the possibility that information provided to the referral service will be discoverable by the opposing party in any subsequent litigation.

Lawyer referral services may have minimal requirements for participation, and in some cases may not do any verification of a lawyer's qualification or credentials. As a consequence, it remains necessary for a person who uses a referral service to investigate a lawyer's qualification before retaining the lawyer.

Some controversy also arises from whether professional referral services are anti-competitive in nature. For instance, since Board Certified attorneys often charge a higher hourly rate than other competent general practitioners, if a Lawyer Referral Service requires Board Certification for certain types of referrals, instead of merely providing the public a choice between a Board Certified attorney and a competent attorney who is not Board Certified, the effect may be to restrict competition and restrict public choice and push up consumer prices. State bars, which license attorneys, may be complicit in restricting client choice.
