= Muna Hotel attack =

Terrorist attack on a hotel in Somalia on 24 August 2010

- Location: Muna Hotel, Mogadishu, Somalia
- Date: 24 August 2010 (UTC)
- Target: Government officials
- Deaths: 32

The Muna Hotel in the Somali capital of Mogadishu was attacked by al-Shabaab fighters on 24 August 2010. The hotel was known to host government officials and other politicians. More fighting in the city began on 23 August.

== Background ==
On 23 August 2010, fighting began in Mogadishu after al-Shabaab fighters declared a "massive, final" war against what they called "invaders" and attacked army barracks in several districts of Mogadishu.

In July, the terrorist group al-Shabaab claimed responsibility for two suicide bombings in Kampala, the capital of Uganda. Those attacks took the lives of 76 people.

== Details ==
On 24 August 2010, al-Shabaab fighters attacked the Muna hotel that was known to house government officials and other politicians. The death toll in the attack rose to 32 people. At least 11 Somali MPs were reported killed. The hotel was targeted because it was popular with government officials as it is in a government-controlled area close to the presidential palace and the security is tight.

Two assailants disguised themselves by dressing in Somali government uniforms. The attackers began by shooting civilian passersby outside the building. They moved inside and shot at hotel staff, government personnel (many of whom were armed), and security guards. The assailants then blew themselves up within the building, as additional security forces arrived.

The number of dead parliamentarians was later revised downward to four: their names were given as Mohamed Hassan M. Nur, Geddi Abdi Gadid, Bulle Hassan Mo'allim and Idiris Muse Elmi. In addition, five legislators wounded in the attack were identified by Acting Speaker of Parliament Abdiweli Sheik Ibrahim Mudey as Ali Abdikadir Mo'allim, Ali Mohamud Abdi, Ahmed Sheik M. Mohamud, Mohamed Ateye Farid and Isaq Ibrahim Ali. By August 25, the number of dead parliamentarians had risen to six.

== Responsibility and aftermath of the attack ==
Sheikh Ali Mohamoud Rage, an al-Shabaab spokesman, said his fighters were starting a new war against "invaders," a reference to the 6,000 African Union Mission to Somalia (AMISOM) troops deployed to support Transitional Federal Government forces. He also said that al-Shabaab intends to "eradicate the invaders and apostate government troops. I call on all al-Shabaab troops, beginning at this hour, to invade and destroy all entrenchments of the apostate and Christian troops."

Ethiopia's Ministry of Foreign Affairs said a statement that "Al-Shabab and its foreign-based allies who are opposed to [the] peace process have deliberately continued to disrupt effort to build a stable Somalia." It also said that "it is time that collective efforts are exerted to bring an end to Al-Shabab’s acts of terrorism; there by bring peace and security to the country and to build a functional Somali state." It gave condolences to the families and friends of the victims as well.

Journalist Nick Wadhams wrote for Time on August 25 that the "brazen" attack proved that al-Shabaab poses an existential threat to the central government. He quoted Ali Osman, a senior official in the Ministry for Industry, as saying "The government does not have enough power to defeat al-Shabab and to secure the safety of Mogadishu... This is shameful". He also quoted Somali MP Mohammed Abdi, as saying "let's not hide the truth... If the AU and the international community don't come in the next few weeks to help us I don't think we'll have a government of Somalia."

== See also ==
- Somali Civil War
- Transitional Federal Government
