= Jack Pitney =

American businessman

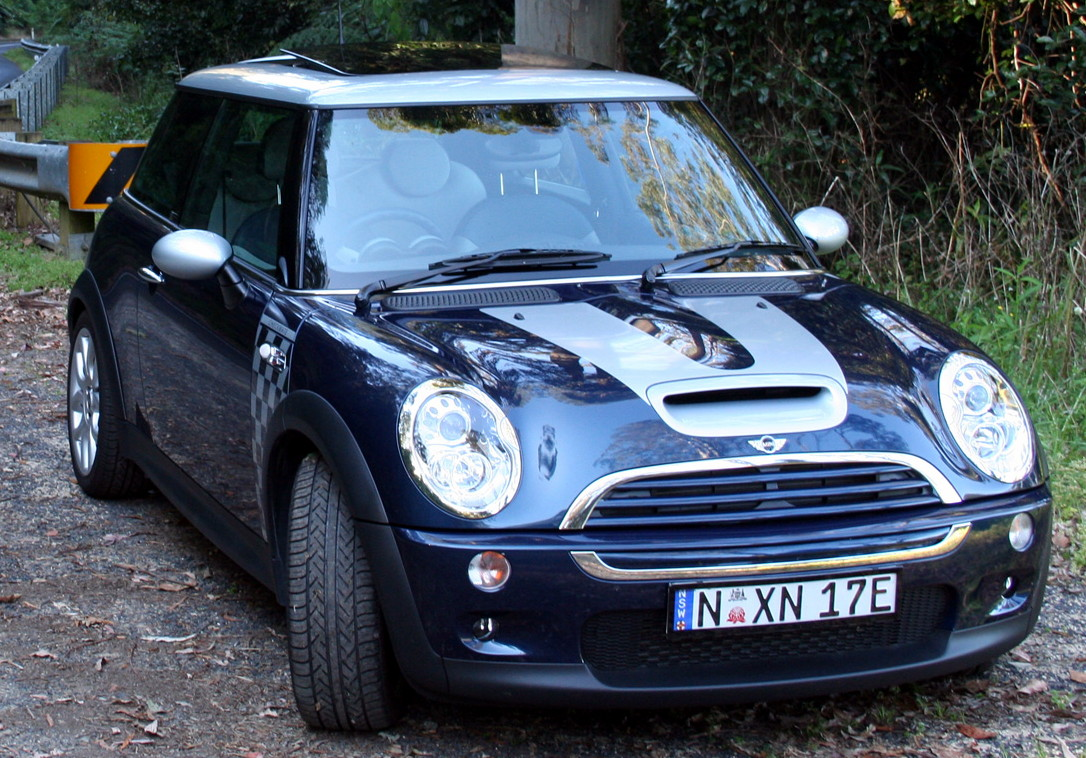
A 2006 Mini Cooper S Checkmate.

William Jackson "Jack" Pitney (January 5, 1963 – August 26, 2010) was an American marketing executive with BMW as vice president of marketing, where he played a major role in convincing company leadership to go ahead with distribution of the MINI in the United States, despite concerns that car buyers there would not buy cars that small given the popularity of sport utility vehicles.

Pitney was born in 1963 in Stamford, Connecticut and earned his undergraduate degree from Occidental College, where he majored in political science. He worked in the public relations and advertising field, and was hired in 1988 by the GCI Group, where he worked on a 1990 advertising campaign for Infiniti. At Hill & Knowlton he worked on the Mazda Motor of America account and later was hired by Mazda as its manager of corporate communications.

Pitney was hired by BMW of North America in 1995 as head of corporate communications, where he developed advertising campaigns for its high-performance vehicles. BMW developed the Mini in 2001 as a successor to the original Mini, which enjoyed a cult following in the 1960s. BMW executives were reluctant to market the car in the United States, presuming that car buyers in that country would be unlikely to purchase a car so small given the widespread prevalence of SUVs. In 2001, Pitney was named as general manager for the Mini line. The company agreed to market the car in the U.S. with very low expectations, but Pitney developed a marketing campaign together with Crispin Porter + Bogusky that used viral marketing on the web and featured billboards promoting the car under the catchphrases "The SUV Backlash Officially Starts Now" and "0% Body Fat". By the March 2002 American launch date for the Mini, 53% of people were aware of the brand and 50,000 people had expressed potential interest on the company's website in buying the car.

The Mini was positioned at a higher price than many comparably sized vehicles, but was promoted as a car that could be accessorized by its owners. Recognized as one of the few car division heads to come from the advertising side of the business Automotive News selected Pitney as one of its two Marketers of the Year in January 2003. Annual sales reached 30,000, exceeding initial projections by 50%. The success of the MINI earned Pitney a promotion to Vice President of Marketing, where he was responsible for multiple launches including the new BMW 1 Series, the BMW X6, the BMW 7 Series, the BMW Z4, BMW diesel engines, and the BMW 5 Series.

As of September 1, 2010, he was supposed to assume the post of Vice President of BMW's Eastern region, where he would have overseen the 93 dealerships on the East Coast of the United States, including the many centered in the New York metropolitan area.

== Death ==
A resident of Ridgewood, New Jersey, Pitney died at age 47 on August 26, 2010, when the tractor he was riding while on vacation at his farm in Durham, New York overturned on him while pulling out a tree stump. He was found by officers of the Greene County, New York Sheriff's Department trapped underneath the tractor and was pronounced dead at the scene. He was survived by his wife and five children.
