= Geddi Abdi Gadid =

Somali politician (d. 2010)

Geddi Abdi Gadid (died August 24, 2010) was a Somali politician, a member of the Transitional Federal Parliament. He was among the people killed in the attack on the Hotel Muna in Mogadishu by al-Shabaab, as were fellow parliamentarians Mohamed Hassan M. Nur, Bulle Hassan Mo'allim and Idiris Muse Elmi.
