= Idiris Muse Elmi =

Somali politician (died 2010)

Idiris Muse Elmi (died August 24, 2010) was a Somali politician, a member of the Transitional Federal Parliament. He was among the people killed in the attack on the Hotel Muna in Mogadishu by al-Shabaab as were fellow parliamentarians: Mohamed Hassan M. Nur, Geddi Abdi Gadid, and Bulle Hassan Mo'allim Idiris was from northern regions specially Lughaya Awdal Region (Badaraxaan).
