= Mohamed Hassan M. Nur =

Somalian politician

Mohamed Hassan M. Nur (died August 24, 2010) was a Somali politician. A member of the Transitional Federal Parliament, he was among the people killed in the attack on the Hotel Muna in Mogadishu by al-Shabaab, as were fellow parliamentarians Geddi Abdi Gadid, Bulle Hassan Mo'allim, and Idiris Muse Elmi.
