= Bulle Hassan Mo'allim =

Somalian politician

Bulle Hassan Mo'allim (died August 24, 2010) was a Somali politician, a member of the Transitional Federal Parliament. He was among the people killed in the attack on the Hotel Muna in Mogadishu by al-Shabaab as were fellow parliamentarians Mohamed Hassan M. Nur, Geddi Abdi Gadid, and Idiris Muse Elmi.
