= Geisinger Health System =

Healthcare organization in Pennsylvania, United States

Geisinger Health
- Type: Non-profit
- Industry: Health care
- Headquarters: Danville, Pennsylvania, US
- Number of locations: 10 hospitals 126 care sites (2024)
- Key people: Terry Gilliland (President and CEO)
- Revenue: ▲$7.7 billion (2023)
- Operating income: ▲-$37 million (2023)
- Net income: ▲$366.6 million (2023)
- Number of employees: 26,000 (2024)
- Parent: Risant Health
- Website: geisinger.org

Geisinger Health System is a regional health care provider to central, south-central and northeastern Pennsylvania. Headquartered in Danville, Pennsylvania, Geisinger services over 3 million patients in 45 counties. Geisinger operates ten hospitals, a medical school, and Life Flight, an air ambulance service.

On March 31, 2024, Geisinger was acquired by Risant Health, with Geisinger continuing to operate under its own name.

== History ==
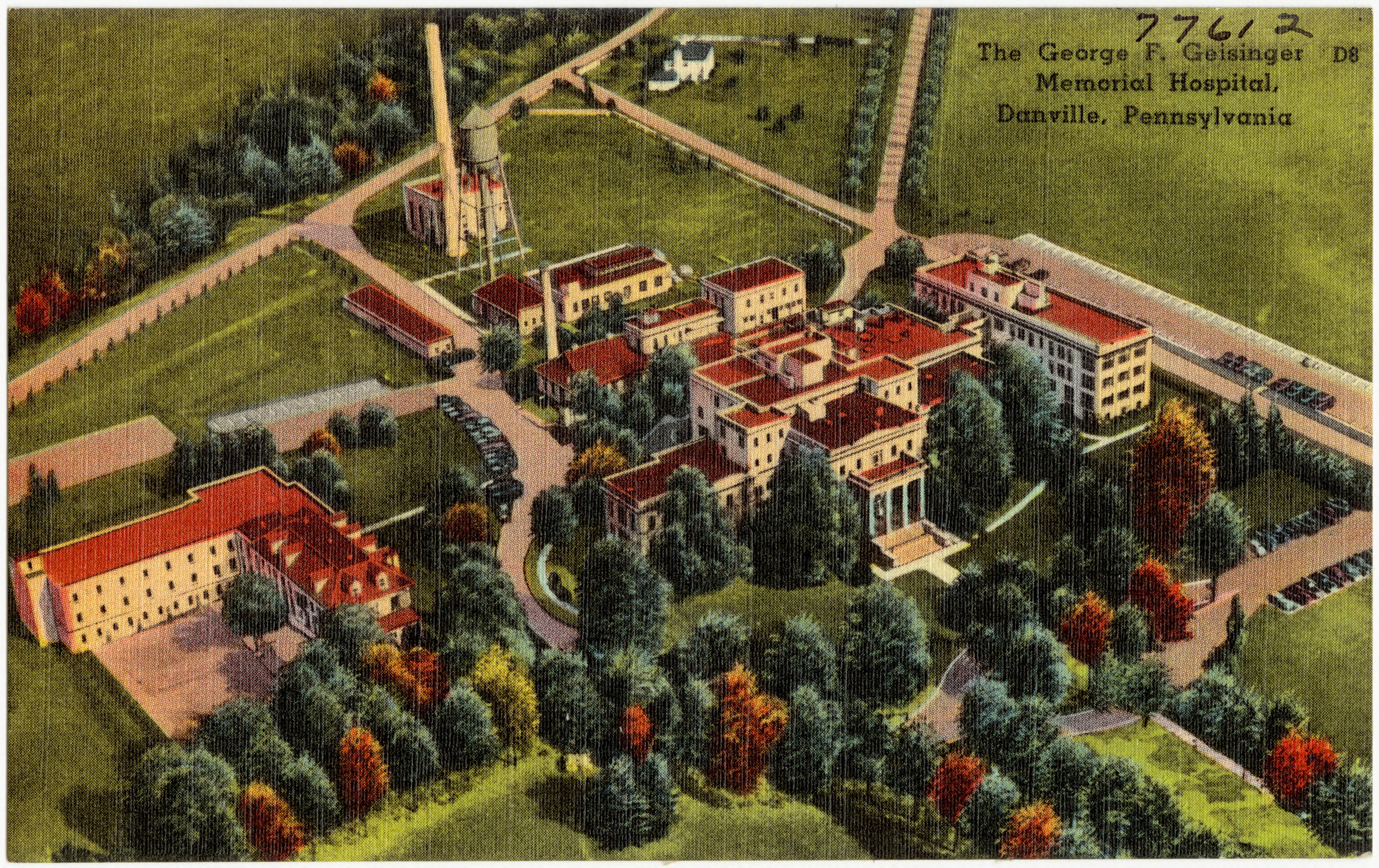
Postcard of the George F. Geisinger Memorial Hospital

Geisinger was named after iron magnate George Geisinger by his widow, Abigail Geisinger. The George F. Geisinger Memorial Hospital was founded in Danville in 1915 and later became Geisinger Medical Center.

Geisinger Health Plan, a subsidiary health management organization (HMO), was started in 1985.

From 2001 through mid 2015, Glenn Steele served as Geisinger's president and chief executive officer (CEO). Steele left Geisinger in 2015, with David Feinberg joining as president and CEO. In December 2018, Jaewon Ryu became president and CEO. Ryu formerly served as the health system's executive vice president and chief medical officer since 2016.

On April 26, 2023, Kaiser Permanente announced it would acquire Geisinger. As part of the deal, Geisinger would operate as an independent subsidiary, folded into a new non-profit group called Risant Health; the transaction was completed on March 31, 2024. Terry Gilliland became president and CEO of Geisinger, while Jaewon Ryu became CEO of Risant Health.

== About ==
Geisinger serves over half a million patients across multiple states in the Northeastern United States. Geisinger's primary geographical area of coverage is central and northeastern Pennsylvania. The organization offers internal health insurance plans to the public within its coverage area. Geisinger also conducts medical research and operates both Geisinger Commonwealth School of Medicine and the Geisinger-Lewistown School of Nursing. The organization also has a charitable arm, the Geisinger Foundation.

=== Programs and practices ===
In 2015, Geisinger launched a patient satisfaction program called ProvenExperience, which offers refunds of co-pays or deductibles to patients unhappy with their medical treatment or other aspects of care. In 2017, it started the Fresh Food Farmacy, a program that provides free healthy foods and nutrition advice to low-income patients with diabetes. In 2018, Geisinger introduced a program that drives patients unable to arrange their own transportation to medical appointments or pharmacies.

Geisinger incorporates electronic health records (EHRs) and genomics into its healthcare practices. Geisinger first adopted EHRs in 1996. By 2002, it was using Tel-a-Nurse, a service that allowed patients to call and receive medical advice from nurses informed by EHRS. In 2007, Geisinger opened a genetic biobank and screening program called MyCode, which sequences the genetic code of volunteer patients to screen them for risk markers of diseases. As of 2018, MyCode had obtained genetic information from over 200,000 patient volunteers. This bank of genetic material has also been used for medical research purposes.

=== Research ===
In 1967, Geisinger was awarded a federal grant to study the effectiveness of medications to prevent heart attacks or their recurrence. In 1974, the Central Pennsylvania Chapter of the Arthritis Foundation awarded a grant to Geisinger to study the potential treatment of Raynaud syndrome with drugs normally used to treat high blood pressure at that time.

Geisinger has a database of electronic health records (EHR), and set up a genetics research program called MyCode in 2007. The use of EHR allows longitudinal study of patient outcomes through a study called "DiscovEHR". The program uses gene sequencing by the biotechnology company Regeneron Pharmaceuticals. The National Institutes of Health awarded a grant of US$5.5 million to the research program in 2016. The program was expanded to include whole exome sequencing in 2018. Using the patient volunteers' genetic data stored in its MyCode program, Geisinger has conducted or collaborated on genetic research studies aimed at identifying potential links between genetic variants and risk factors for certain diseases. Geisinger contributed data from 35,000 of its patients to a 2016 Johns Hopkins University study that demonstrated linkages between asthma and fracking. In 2021, a Regeneron-led study partially based on genetic data from the MyCode biobank identified a genetic variant that appears to lower obesity risk.

=== Education ===
On January 1, 2017, Geisinger acquired the Commonwealth School of Medicine in Scranton, Pennsylvania. Opened in 2008, the school had struggled financially prior to its acquisition. Geisinger agreed to assume the school's nearly $40 million debt as part of the acquisition. Geisinger Commonwealth School of Medicine received a $3.4 million grant from the federal government in 2017 to promote diversity and provide opportunities for disadvantaged communities. In order to "fix the primary care shortage facing the organization", Geisinger announced a program in 2019 to cover full tuition plus a $2,000 monthly stipend for 40 students committing to work at Geisinger for at least four years after completing a residency.

=== Partnerships ===
Geisinger has partnered with for-profit behavioral health operator Acadia Healthcare to operate some of its facilities.

== Facilities ==
Geisinger operates over 100 care sites including 10 hospitals.

=== Danville ===
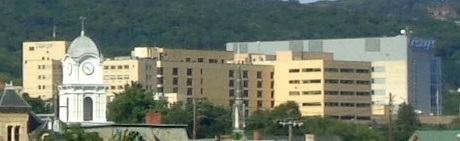
Geisinger Medical Center in Danville

Geisinger Medical Center (GMC) is the organization's flagship hospital in Danville. It is an adult level I trauma center, and the adjoined Janet Weis Children's Hospital is a pediatric level II trauma center.

=== Bloomsburg ===
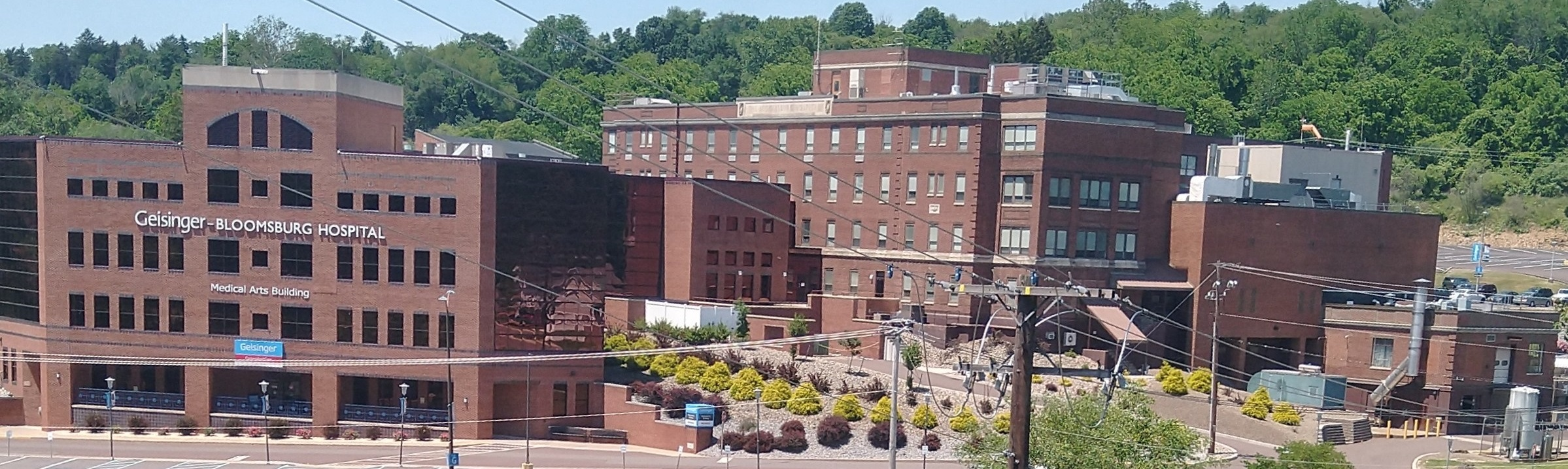
Geisinger Bloomsburg Hospital

Geisinger Bloomsburg Hospital (GBH), formerly Bloomsburg Hospital, was acquired by Geisinger in 2012. It is located in Bloomsburg.

=== Centre County ===
Geisinger Healthplex State College is a clinic with 41 exam rooms and a surgical suite. Geisinger completed an expansion of the healthplex in January 2025.

Geisinger collaborates with Mount Nittany Medical Center, and Life Flight is contracted with Centre Lifelink EMS.

In 2024, Geisinger opened a new medical clinic in Bellefonte, consolidating services including urgent care and primary care.

=== Jersey Shore ===
Geisinger Jersey Shore Hospital in Jersey Shore became a level IV trauma center in 2021. A helipad was added for Life Flight.

=== Lackawanna County ===
Geisinger Community Medical Center (GCMC) in Scranton is a level II trauma center.

Geisinger Marworth is located in Waverly.

=== Lewistown ===
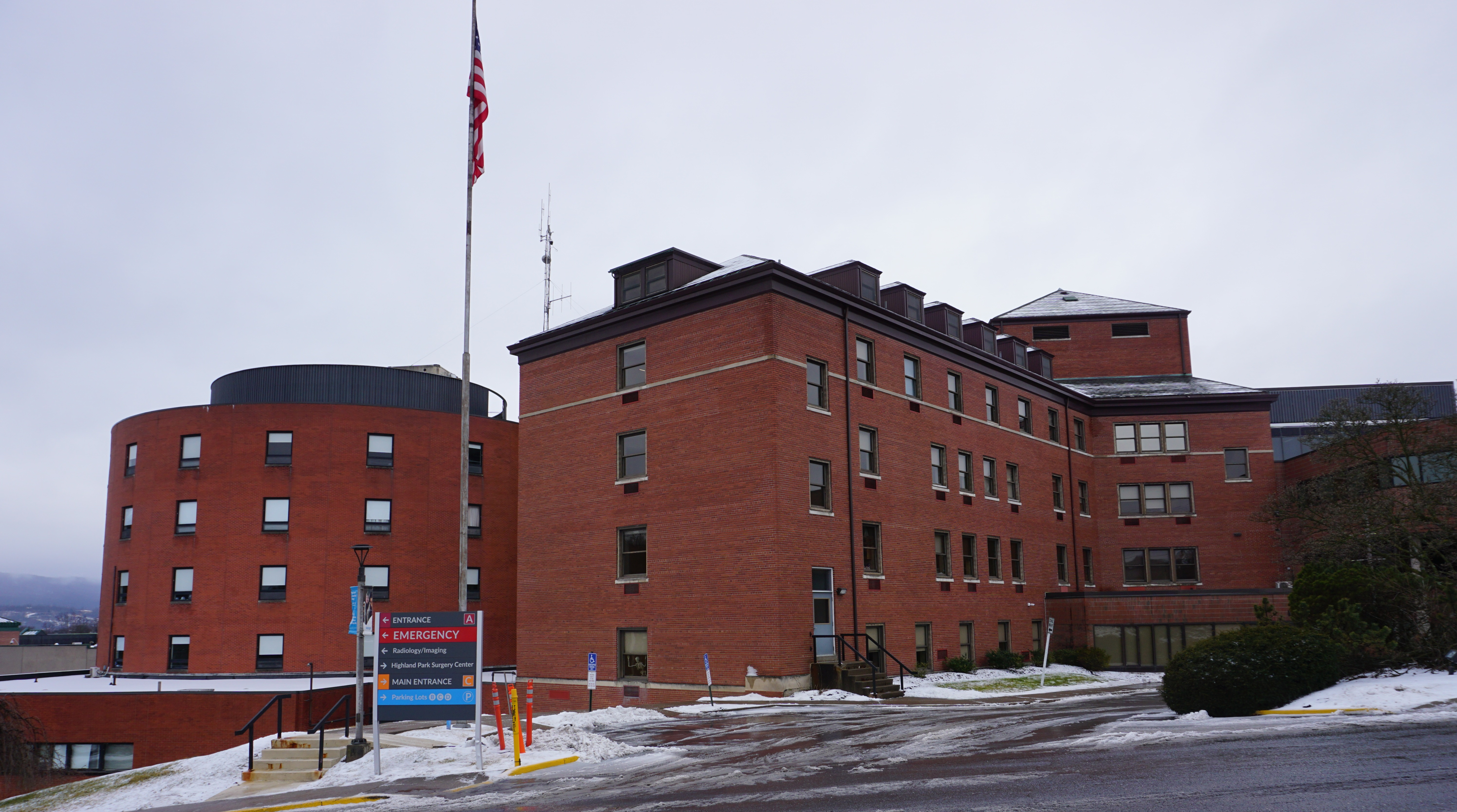
Geisinger Lewistown Hospital

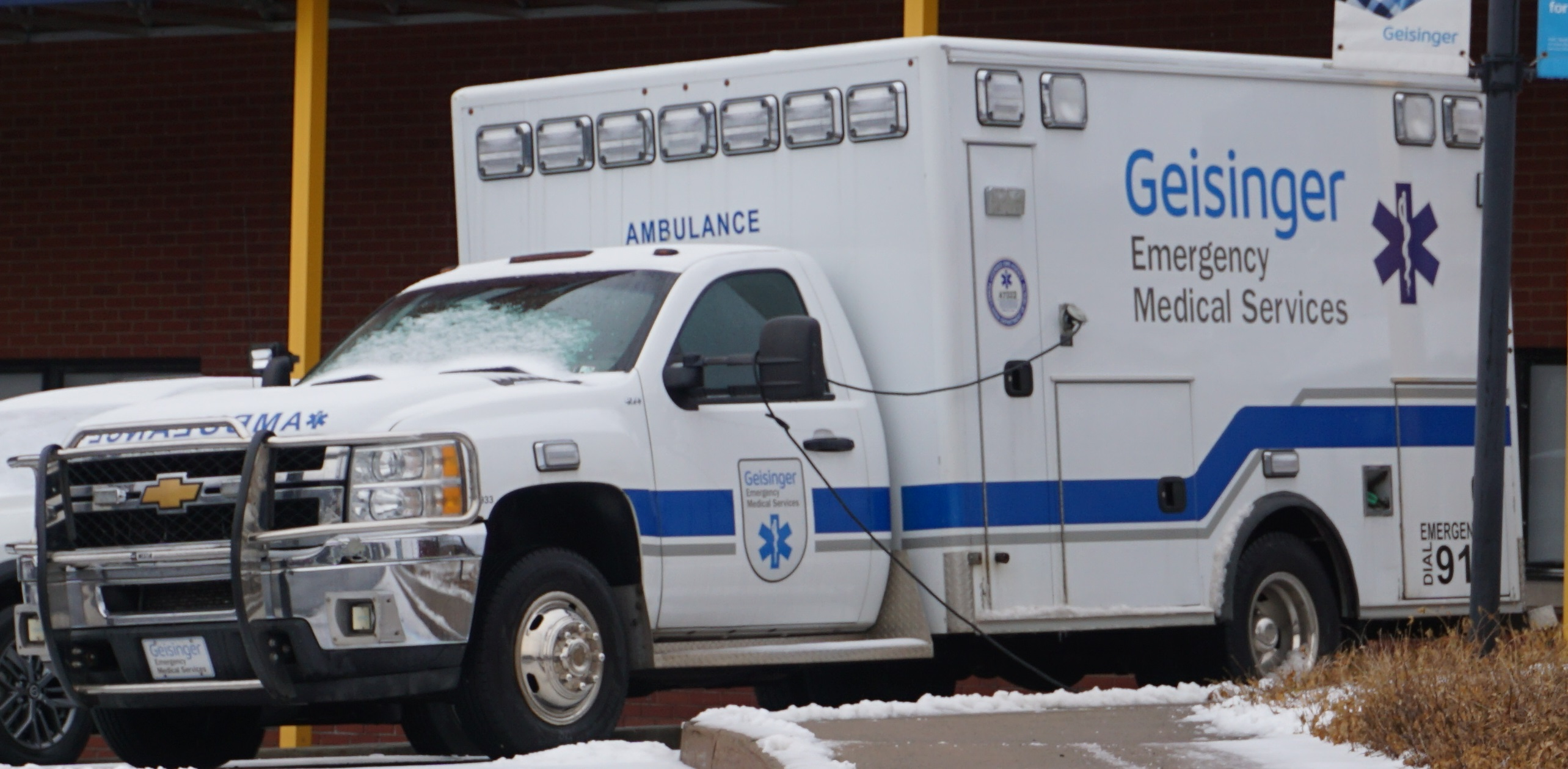
Geisinger EMS at GLH

Geisinger-Lewistown Hospital (GLH) is located in Lewistown. In 2012, Geisinger Health System and Lewistown Hospital signed a letter of intent for a merger. Independent physicians had opposed a merger with Geisinger, stating that with the presence of a Geisinger clinic in Lewistown and with Geisinger offering health insurance, a monopoly might result from the merger, ultimately hurting instead of helping local healthcare. The full merger and integration of Lewistown Hospital into Geisinger Health System received final approval from the Pennsylvania Attorney General and the Pennsylvania Department of Health. The new Geisinger-Lewistown Hospital became effective on November 1, 2013.

GLH has offered a school of nursing since 2005. It became a level IV trauma center in 2021 and has a concrete helipad.

=== Orwigsburg ===
Geisinger St. Luke's Hospital is located in Orwigsburg.

=== Wilkes-Barre ===
Geisinger Wyoming Valley Medical Center (GWV) is a level I trauma center in Plains Township on the outskirts of Wilkes-Barre.

Geisinger South Wilkes-Barre Hospital (GSWB) is located in downtown Wilkes-Barre.

=== Shamokin ===
Geisinger Shamokin Area Community Hospital (GSACH) is located in Shamokin.

== Life Flight ==
Life Flight
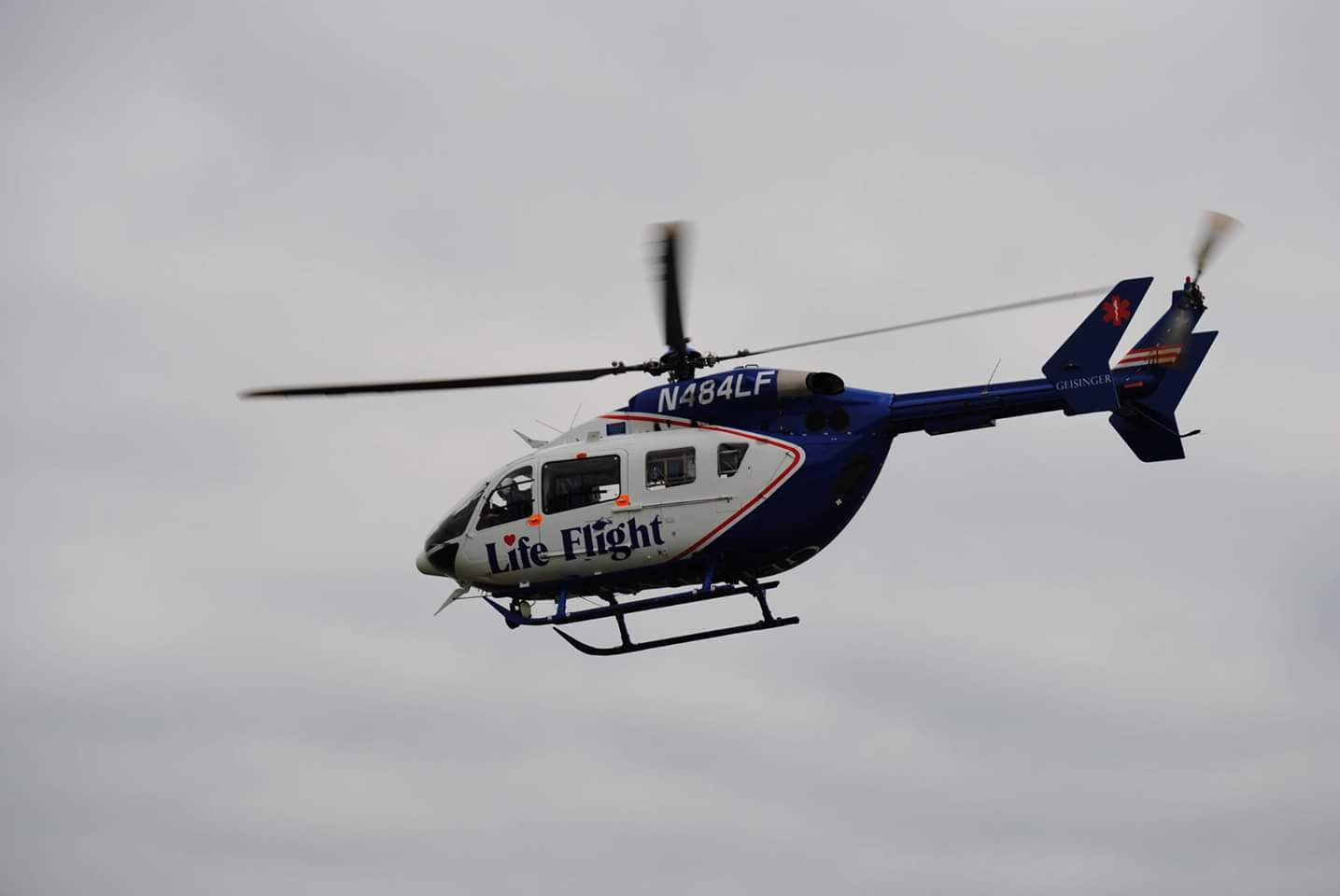
- Life Flight EC145 landing at Williamsport Regional Airport
| IATA | ICAO | Call sign |
|---|---|---|
| LFE | 1LFE | LIFE FLIGHT |
- Founded: 1981
- Operating bases: Geisinger Medical Center Heliport; State College Regional Airport; Wilkes-Barre/Scranton International Airport; Williamsport Regional Airport; Schuylkill County Airport; Jake Arner Memorial Airport
- Fleet size: 9
- Headquarters: Danville, Pennsylvania, United States

Life Flight is an air ambulance service operated by Geisinger. It consists of nine helicopters and transports around 3,600 patients annually. Each crew consists of a pilot, flight nurse, and flight paramedic. The aircraft are equipped with autopilot and night vision.

=== History ===
Life Flight was founded in 1981 as the second air ambulance service in Pennsylvania. It conducted 430 transports its first year with a leased Alouette helicopter. In 2012, Geisinger Life Flight received an air carrier certificate from the Federal Aviation Administration (FAA), allowing Geisinger to directly operate the aircraft and employ support personnel.

Aircraft experienced incidents in 1996 and 2013, with personnel sustaining minor injuries and no injuries respectively.

=== Fleet ===
| Aircraft | In service | Notes |
|---|---|---|
| Eurocopter EC145 | 8 | Based in Selinsgrove, State College, Avoca, Williamsport, Minersville, and Lehighton |
| MBB/Kawasaki BK117 | 1 | |
| Total | 9 | |

== Financials ==
Financial figures for inpatient hospitals in the Geisinger system in 2023
| Hospital | Net patient revenue (NPR) (thousands) | Total operating expenses (thousands) | Operating margin | Total margin | Uncompensated care | Medicare share of NPR | Medical Assistance share of NPR | Total operating revenue (thousands) | Operating income (thousands) | Net income (thousands) |
| Geisinger Bloomsburg | $71,155 | $70,498 | 3.09% | 2.99% | 1.99% | 28.99% | 11.42% | $72,743 | $2,245 | $2,176 |
| Geisinger Community | $441,340 | $456,988 | -2.73% | -6.34% | 1.18% | 36.73% | 13.17% | $444,860 | -$12,129 | -$27,265 |
| Geisinger Danville | $1,457,206 | $1,494,761 | 3.15% | 0.86% | 0.97% | 32.17% | 13.14% | $1,543,435 | $48,674 | $12,892 |
| Geisinger Jersey Shore | $43,186 | $39,368 | 9.66% | 9.43% | 1.68% | 49.22% | 15.21% | $43,577 | $4,209 | $4,099 |
| Geisinger Lewistown | $186,103 | $175,346 | 7.06% | 5.12% | 1.95% | 35.49% | 8.51% | $188,662 | $13,316 | $9,460 |
| Geisinger MC Muncy | $36,025 | $52,607 | -39.99% | -39.99% | 1.59% | 59.75% | 13.89% | $37,580 | -$15,028 | -$15,027 |
| Geisinger St Luke's | $73,960 | $67,778 | 10.50% | 10.53% | 1.12% | 42.15% | 6.96% | $75,731 | $7,953 | $7,975 |
| Geisinger Wyoming Valley | $739,779 | $721,960 | 5.20% | 4.05% | 1.22% | 32.33% | 16.88% | $761,574 | $39,614 | $30,496 |

For comparison, in 2023 the Pennsylvania average operating margin and total margin were 2.26% and 3.44% respectively. The Pennsylvania average uncompensated care percent of NPR was 1.39%. The Pennsylvania average portion of NPR paid by Medicare and Medical Assistance was 35.4% and 14.9% respectively. The average payment per inpatient day for Medicare and Medical Assistance was $2,725 and $2,958 respectively, while commercial payers paid an average of $5,960 per inpatient day.

In fiscal year 2020, CEO Jaewon Ryu earned $4.6 million.
