= Hurricane Aircat =

US Army airboats used in Vietnam

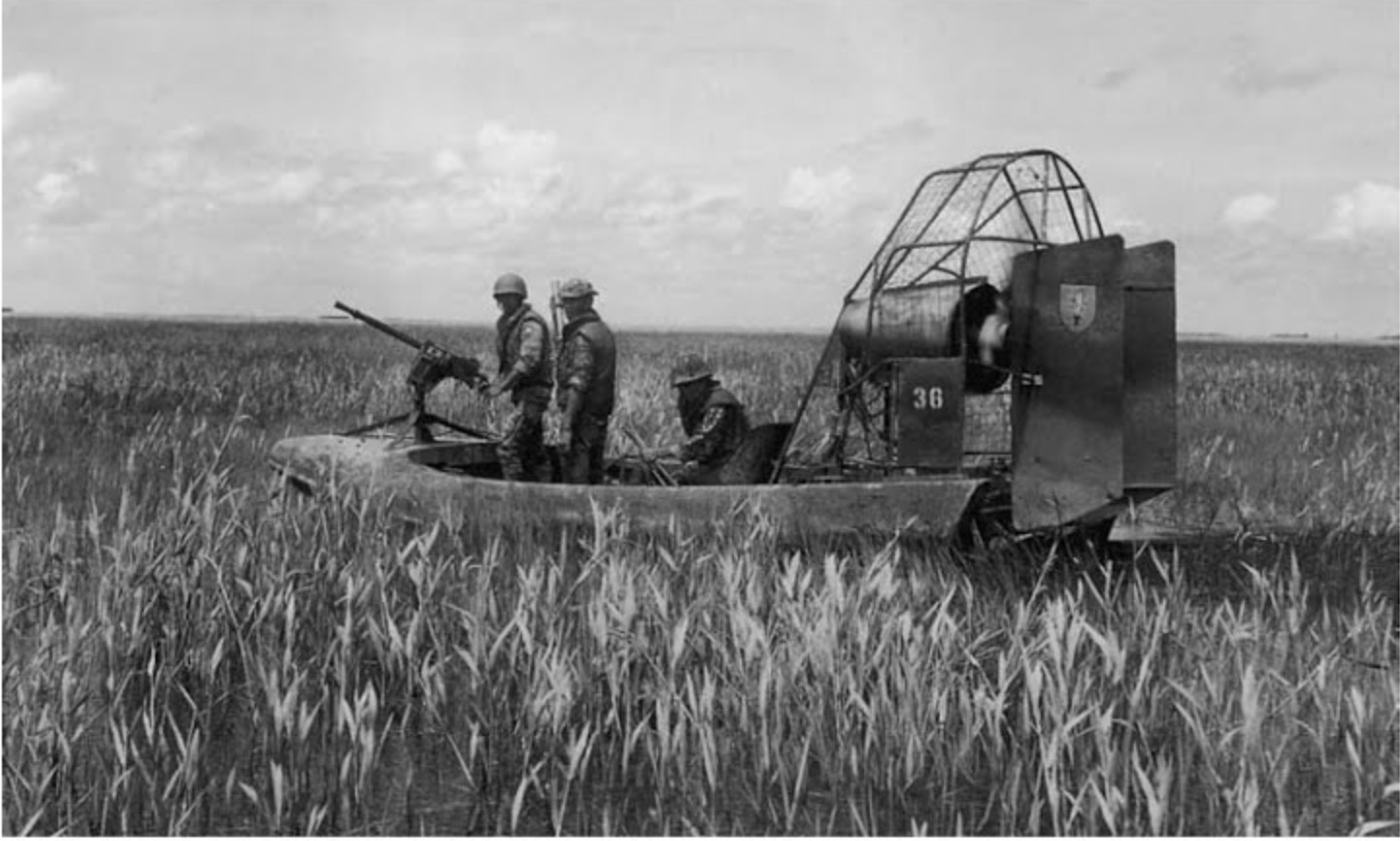
- A MIKE Force Hurricane Aircat in Vietnam

Class overview
- Builders: Hurricane Fiberglass
- Operators: US Army; Army of the Republic of Vietnam; Khmer National Navy; Republic of Korea Army
- In commission: 1964–1972
- Completed: 84+
- Active: 0

General characteristics
- Type: Airboat patrol boat
- Displacement: 1,150 pounds (520 kg)
- Length: 17 feet (5.2 m)
- Beam: 7.25 feet (2.21 m)
- Draft: 4 inches (0.10 m)
- Propulsion: 180 hp (130 kW) Lycoming O-360 aircraft engine
- Speed: 42–65 knots (48–75 mph; 78–120 km/h)
- Range: 100 miles (160 km)
- Complement: 5–6 enlisted
- Armament: 1 x M1919 .30 caliber (7.62 mm) machine gun (bow) or 1 × M2HB .50 caliber (12.7 mm) machine gun (bow) Crew small arms, M31 rifle grenades, and/or M79 grenade launchers
- Armor: None
- Notes: Specifications are for the military Aircats used by the US Army and may not hold true for civilian models.

The Hurricane Aircat was an airboat used as a riverine patrol boat by the US Army and South Vietnamese Army (ARVN) during the Vietnam War. It was used to conduct various counterinsurgency (COIN) and patrol missions in riverine and marshy areas where larger boats could not go.

== Background ==
The Viet Cong (VC) insurgents, one of the US Army's main enemies in Vietnam, relied heavily on motorized and paddled sampans to move troops and supplies throughout the canals, streams, swamps, and rivers abundant in Vietnam, particularly in the Mekong River delta. The boats used by US forces prior to the Aircat's 1964 introduction relied on screw-propellers, which would become fouled by aquatic plants and thus rendered useless. US forces sometimes used paddled sampans to avoid this problem, although these sampans had the same speed as the VC ones and so were unable to effectively pursue and defeat them. Because US boats had trouble navigating the waters of the Mekong Delta, the region quickly became home to many Viet Cong strongholds and logistics bases.

In 1961, the US Navy brought airboats and pump-jet boats, neither of which rely on propellers in the water, to Vietnam at the behest of ARVN for testing. The Navy found that airboats outperformed pump-jets and screw-propeller boats in all respects except noise, although they concluded that airboats' noise made them unacceptable for use in counterinsurgency operations. Army special forces and others in the US and South Vietnamese militaries disagreed, however.

== Development and selection ==
In spring of 1964, US Special Forces advisers to ARVN forces in South Vietnam expressed a need for fast, shallow-draft boats. In response, the Commander of the Military Assistance Command in Vietnam, (COMUSMACV) stated an operational requirement in June 1964 for shallow-draft boats capable of carrying 4-5 troops plus crew-served weapons that could negotiate aquatic plants and other obstacles abundant in marshes and rice paddies at speeds of at least 20 miles per hour (32 km/h). The Commander-in-Chief of the US Pacific Command (CINCPAC) approved the request on June 19, 1964, and ordered six airboats from two commercial manufacturers—the Hurricane Fiberglass Products Company of Auburndale, Florida and Susquehanna Danville Airport of Danville, Pennsylvania—to evaluate and test them and then select a winner. The Susquehanna airboats were a joint venture between Ken Burrows-owned Danville Airport of Danville and Mari-Mar Industries of Port Trevorton, Pennsylvania. The two models of airboats evaluated were the Hurricane Aircat and the Susquehanna Skimmer.

Each Aircat and Skimmer cost about $6,000 each in 1964 (equivalent to about $49,000 in 2018).

The Army finished its evaluation by the end of 1965. The Aircat was found to be more durable, maneuverable, and have greater obstacle crossing capabilities than the Skimmer, although the Skimmer outperformed the Aircat in deep water. As such, the Army opted to begin purchasing Aircats in early 1966.

=== Design ===
The Hurricane Aircat had a rectangular hull 17 feet (5.2 m) long with 7.25 feet (2.21 m) beam. The draft varied with speed but was no more than four inches (100 mm). At top speed, the Aircat could draw as little as a single inch (25 mm) of water. The hull was made from five layers of molded fiberglass and was semi-catamaran fore and flat-bottomed aft. This unique hull shape helped the Aircat surmount higher obstacles.

The Aircat was powered by a 4-cylinder Lycoming O-360 aircraft engine providing 180 horsepower (130 kW). The engine was hooked up to a 66-inch (1.7 m) diameter aerial propeller. The propeller blades were made from wood and tipped with bronze, which sometimes caused a problem, as three propellers failed during the evaluation period when the wood rotted and the bronze tips were separated by centrifugal force. Steering was provided by a stick controlling two air rudders aft of the propeller and propeller guard. Counting crew and passengers, the Aircat could carry payloads of up to 2,000 pounds (910 kg).

A .30 caliber (7.62 mm) M1919 machine gun was mounted on a pintle mount in the bow. These guns were found to be accurate up to 200 yards (180 m), comparable to the guns of some WWII fighter aircraft. Some crews substituted this gun for the heavier .50 caliber (12.7 mm) M2HB machine gun to increase the boat's firepower, though the M2HB often proved too powerful for the flimsy vessel. While the gunner fired, the pilot had to pull forward to offset the gun's recoil or risk the boat being blown about or even capsized. The 57mm M18 recoilless rifle was test fired from an Aircat and proved impractical owing to its extensive back blast. The 106mm M40 recoilless rifle was used on airboats “frequently” by the 7th Armored Squadron, 1st Air Cavalry Division, who and “proven very valuable”. Using the 106mm recoilless rifle on an Aircat had little effect on the airboat or on accuracy, but issues arose relating to speed and maneuver (the boat could not attain top speed and was not as maneuverable) and ammunition (only 4 rounds can be carried in the boat with the gun; any additional rounds had to be transferred from other Aircats). The 106mm recoilless rifle was fired off to the side to avoid exposing crew to the back blast. The Aircat enabled bringing the weapon over “terrain where normally a heavy crew served weapon could not be used”.

The Aircat was equipped with an AN/PRC-25 radio for short-range communication. The AN/PRC-25 posed challenges because of the difficulty hearing the radio over the engine noise and the fragility long antennas, which took a beating from bushes, trees, and other obstacles. Testing by the 5th Special Forces Group found that the noise issue could be overcome by using the radio with a CVC tanker's helmet and that the antenna vulnerability issue could be fixed by using a vehicular radio and antenna such as the AN/VRC-12 or AN/VRC-16. Nevertheless, radio problems persisted at least through 1968–69.

== Operational history ==
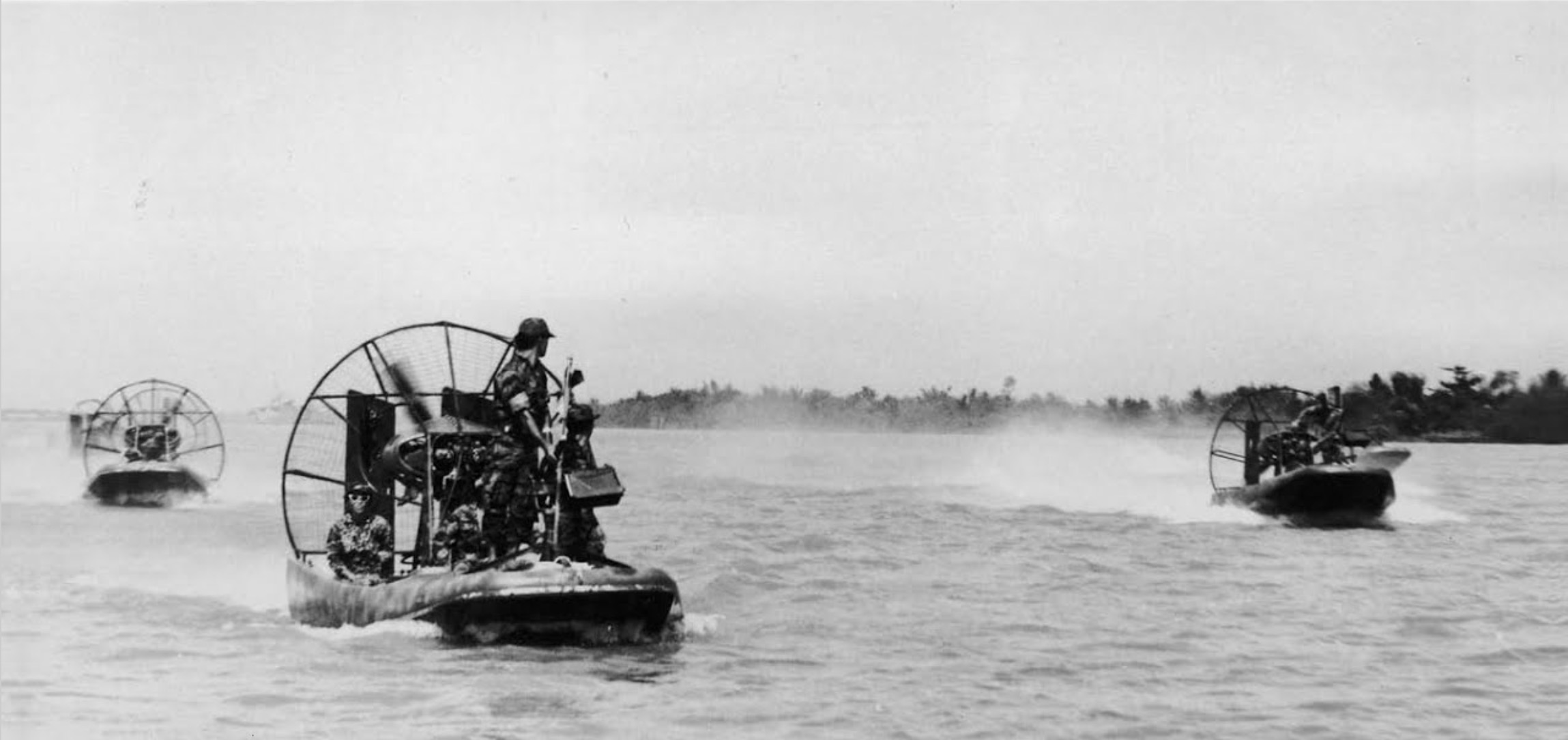
5th Special Forces Company D Aircats on the Mekong near the Cambodian border in 1966

During the Vietnam War the Hurricane Aircat was used by US Special Forces and ARVN to patrol and attack in riverine and marshy areas where larger boats could not go. Aircats were used primarily in the 15,000 square miles (39,000 km^{2}) of the Mekong Delta and Plain of Reeds though they also saw action in the Bảy Núi mountains near the Cambodian border. Its most important contribution to the American war effort was in allowing American Green Berets to attack previously unassailable Viet Cong (VC) support bases and strongholds in wetlands and swamp forests. Aircats saw combat on many occasions in which they engaged Viet Cong forces, captured enemy documents, weapons, and munitions, and received enemy fire and suffered casualties. The Aircat proved effective at many types of missions: in its 104 missions in 1965, encompassing reconnaissance, flank security, and assaults, it killed 86 VC, destroyed 26 of their boats, and achieved most mission objectives.

Aircats were able to clear obstacles that proved insurmountable for other boats. The Aircat could cross 2-foot (0.61 m) high dikes at 20 miles per hour (32 km/h) and there were several examples of US troops encountering obstacles or blockades in other watercraft, such as Swift Boats and river patrol boats, making a note of the obstacle, and then returning in Aircats and proceeding over it. These characteristics made the Aircat invaluable during the rainy monsoon season, as it could easily cross flooded rice paddies and jump dikes between paddies.

The Aircat was very fast relative to other patrol boats, being capable of speeds up to 42 knots (48 mph; 78 km/h) in deep water and 65 knots (75 mph; 120 km/h) on shallow water or rice paddies. Its speed made it ideal for reconnaissance, providing flank security for riverine assault boats, and special forces use. The Aircat's speed and maneuverability was important for US Special Forces because they were able to outrun and outmaneuver most enemy vessels. As such, the craft was used widely by special forces for pursuing and assaulting Viet Cong units in flooded areas in the Mekong Delta. That said, the Aircat's speed and maneuverability could also be a disadvantage, as Aircat crews would often get disoriented without constant aerial observation. The 5th Special Forces Group was especially noteworthy for its use of Aircats, operating 84 of the vessels in the Mekong Delta beginning in early 1967. Colonel Francis J. Kelly, commander of the 5th Special Forces Group from June 1966 to June 1967 and author of a book about US Army Special Forces in Vietnam, praised the Aircat for its "speed and firepower," writing that once tactics adjusted to employ the Aircat to maximum effect, Aircats enabled "telling victories over the Viet Cong" and turned the flood season into a tactical advantage for US forces.

The use of Aircats, increases in troop strength, and introduction of other tactics allowed the 5th Special Forces Group to take the fight to the VC and capture territory in the Delta, helping to make the 50% of territory and CIDG bases that were previously too overrun with Viet Cong to enter safe enough to operate in. It also helped the 5th Special Forces Group mount operations and establish CIDG bases deep into territory previously under the control of the Viet Cong. These gains were not without cost, however: 55 Special Forces and 1,654 Vietnamese were killed during 1967, as well as an estimated 7,000 Viet Cong. The 5th Special Forces Group found that the Aircats were most effective when used in combined arms operations with gunships, as the gunships would locate and engage the enemy while the Aircats would use their speed and maneuverability to seal off escape routes.

The Aircat was also valuable to special forces because it could be easily transported by Chinook helicopter, allowing for flexible operations across southern Vietnam.

In addition to special warfare use, Aircats were used by the South Vietnamese government for transporting important officials and by Vietnamese police forces for inspecting fishing boats.

Crew sizes varied greatly by mission. The Aircat could carry as many as 12, although it generally carried no more than six. Crew sizes were reduced to an average of 5–6 in response to a December 1964 accident in which an airboat carrying 11 ARVN soldiers sank in the Mekong River, drowning five. Observers at the scene believed that the overloading of the boat contributed to the accident. Normal roles for the five-soldier crew were one commander/operator, one machine gunner, one radio operator/assistant gunner, and two riflemen. Aircat airboats in American and South Vietnamese service operated in units of six boats. In use by special forces units, the Aircat often operated with a crew of three: commander/pilot, gunner, and radio operator/grenadier. A rifle platoon could be transported in 6–8 boats.

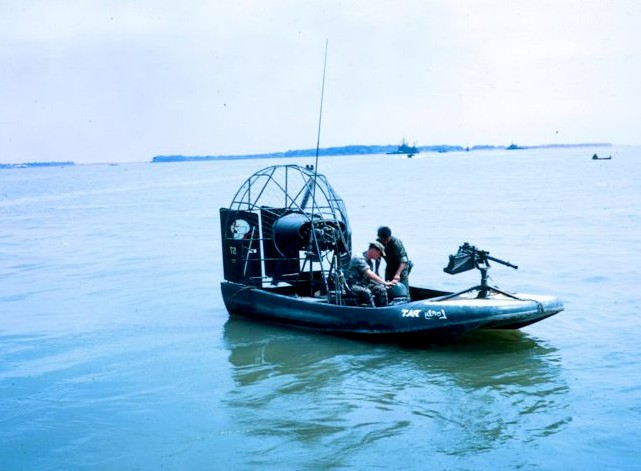
A US Army Aircat on the Mekong in 1969

Initially, Aircats were able to operate with impunity, as they were faster and sturdier than any enemy vessels. Their dominance of the Mekong Delta led the Viet Cong to develop dedicated anti-airboat tactics and introduce several dedicated anti-airboat traps, including a light naval mine mounted on the end of a bamboo pole and piano wire strung between wooden poles that held fishing traps, used to decapitate or injure airboat drivers and gunners. The change in VC tactics exposed a major weakness of the Aircat: the fiberglass hull offered no protection against gunfire or shrapnel. Standard defensive tactics for the Aircat were to "avoid becoming decisively engaged," i.e. to dodge enemy fire and perform offensive actions. The Aircat was also modified to defend against the piano wire traps by welding a large piece of iron to the gun mount that would protect the Aircat crew from the wire.

The Aircat's hull was durable otherwise: it withstood ordinary damage and cross-country travel easily. It was also much sturdier than the wooden sampans used by the enemy Viet Cong; Aircats used ramming attacks against sampans to great effect. In one November 1965 battle involving three Aircats battling a VC platoon embarked on sampans in Kien Tuong province, considered "a classic instance of successful employment of an airboat unit" by the Army Concept Team in Vietnam (ACTIV), ramming attacks were responsible for about half of VC casualties and sampan losses. No Viet Cong survived the battle.

A downside of the Aircat was the level of additional training that it demanded from operators, gunners, and repair personnel. Almost every aspect of operating the Aircat proved to require substantial training. Learning the basics of operating an Aircat took two weeks, although ARVN troops often took longer to reach the desired level of competence. Learning to sail in formation and execute tactical maneuvers would take ARVN troops an additional three weeks. Gunners and riflemen also had to receive training in firing at moving targets while moving towards, laterally, and away from the targets.

Any engine maintenance required bringing in scarce aircraft mechanics. As ACTIV wrote, "Even the most elementary engine repair work required the attention of a skilled mechanic." Though US and South Vietnamese forces had fiberglass-repair capabilities at the unit level, they lacked the ability to do extensive electrical or engine repair, which was often required because the Aircats were initially built with commercial off-the-shelf electrical and drive system components that did not hold up well in Southeast Asian conditions. Of the six original Aircats deployed, one was lost to an accident and the remaining five required considerable engine repair to remain in service by 1965.

Another downside was that Aircats could be very loud. The high noise level of the engine and propeller could give away the boats' position. It also made use of radio equipment difficult while the vehicle was in motion, as it was difficult for crews to hear their radios over the sound of the engine. However, the Aircat's noise was found to be both an advantage and a disadvantage, as it was often impossible for enemies to determine how many Aircats were bearing down on them or from where, especially if the boats were used alongside similarly loud helicopters. The high noise level also contributed to the psychological warfare value of the Aircat, and small groups of Viet Cong would freeze in place when attacked by Aircats. Similarly, field tests by the 5th Special Forces Group Company D eventually found that the using the AN/PRC-25 radio and CVC tanker's helmet sufficiently reduced noise to the point where the radio was usable. However, noise problems persisted at least through 1968. Field research conducted from 1964 to 1966 led to the development of tactics that could minimize the boats' noise level. These tactics combined with the low silhouette and high speed of the boats enabled the Aircats to occasionally be highly stealthy and suitable for operations like surprise attacks, special operations insertions, and reconnaissance.

In August 1970, the 5th Special Forces Group reported to the Military Assistance Command in Vietnam that its Aircats were "excess", indicating that they wanted to dispose of them, as a response to decreased operational requirements caused by President Richard Nixon's Vietnamization policy. The 5th Special Forces Group began turning in its Aircats in December 1970 and finished transferring its Aircats to the Military Assistance Command, South Vietnamese forces, or parties in the continental United States, by March 1971. However, some Aircats remained in US service until 1972.

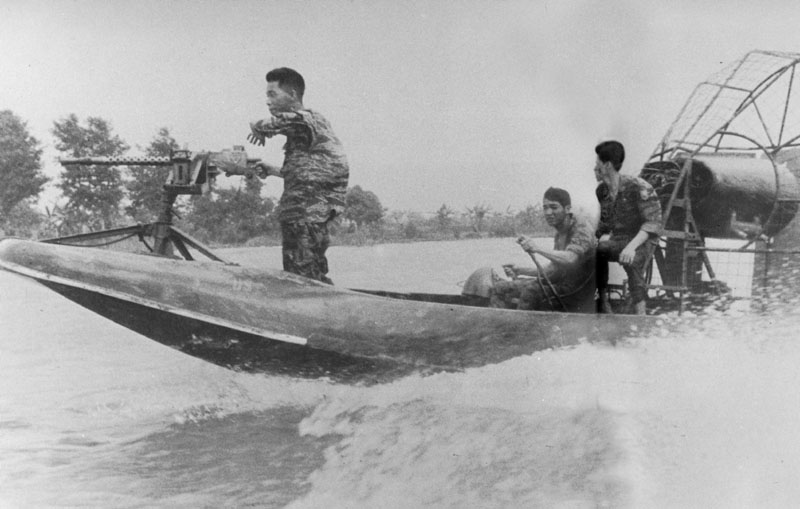
Vietnamese strike troops man a Hurricane Aircat in a river operation

=== Postwar service ===
Following their service in Vietnam, Aircats were either transferred to other militaries or to civilian use. Starting in 1969, the US Army began to transfer Aircats to the South Vietnamese Army (ARVN). US forces began training ARVN troops to operate Aircats soon after the boat's introduction in 1964, and ARVN troops began crewing Aircats as early as 1967. In addition to regular ARVN troops, civilian irregulars crewed Aircats. These irregulars were paid by the South Vietnamese government to perform counterinsurgency and patrol missions along the Mekong River, especially in the Mekong Delta and surrounding area. These irregulars included forces from the Civilian Irregular Defense Group (CIDG) and Nung militiamen from the Mobile Strike Force Command (MIKE Force). US Navy personnel, including Navy SEALs, helped US Army Special Forces train these irregulars.

Many Aircats returned to the United States, where they became widely used by civilians for recreation, commercial jobs, and environmental conservation. Aircats have been used by individuals for fishing, hunting, and personal travel and by companies for tours, geophysical surveying and oil exploration, mosquito control, and transporting workers to oil rigs and construction sites in marshlands. Estimating the number of military Aircats that ended up being transferred to civilians is difficult because Hurricane produced several civilian versions of the Aircat alongside the military model. Between the military and civilian models, over 800 Aircats were built. Some civilian Aircats are still in use today.

Aircats are used widely for wildlife monitoring, biological sampling, and other activities in marshy wildlife preserves, especially in National Wildlife Refuges where they are operated by the US Fish and Wildlife Service. Some Fish and Wildlife Aircats are military surplus, while others are civilian models purchased new. Aircats have proved particularly valuable for bird banding, allowing researchers to band more birds and bird species than was possible using bait-trapping or other methods, although the loud noise of their engines can scare off wildlife.

Some civilian Aircats have made their way outside the United States, where they have found use in 28 countries around the world. Outside the United States, Aircats have been used by civilians to transport lumberjacks in Pakistan, bring sick people to missionary clinics in East Pakistan (modern Bangladesh), control weeds on the Panama Canal, herd livestock in Venezuela, and transport animal specimens in Colombia.

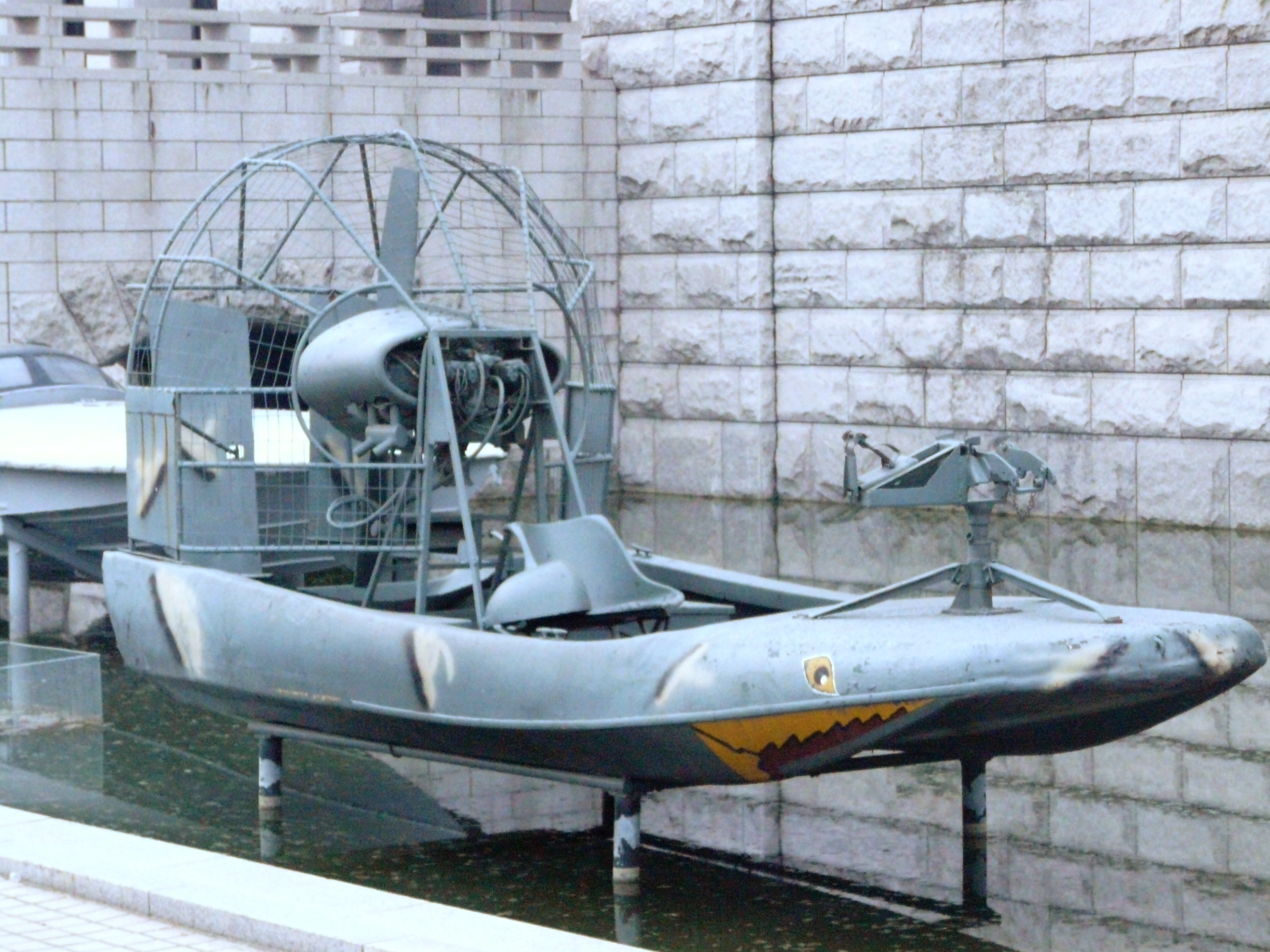
A Hurricane Aircat used by South Korean Special Forces in Vietnam. This airboat is on display at the War Memorial of Korea.

== Operators ==
United States

- The US Army operated Aircats from 1964 to 1972
  - 5th Special Forces Group
  - 7th Armored Squadron, 1st Air Cavalry Division
  - 9th Infantry Division
  - MIKE Force: various MIKE Force units operated Aircats starting in 1966; formal Airboat Company organized in June 1968
    - 4th Mobile Strike Force

South Vietnam

- Many Aircats were turned over to the South Vietnamese Army (ARVN) beginning in 1969. Aircats were operated by the engineer battalions of ARVN divisions, with crews provided by infantry battalions.
  - 1st Airborne Division
  - III Corps
    - 5th Infantry Division
  - IV Corps
    - 9th Infantry Division
    - 21st Infantry Division

Khmer Republic

- The Khmer National Navy, the naval forces of the Khmer Republic (now Cambodia) operated two Aircats from 1967 to 1973. These Aircats were captured from US Special Forces by the People's Army of Vietnam (PAVN) in September 1967.

Republic of Korea

- South Korean Special Forces used Aircats while deployed to Vietnam from September 1964 to March 1972.

== See also ==
- Patrol Air Cushion Vehicle
- Small unit riverine craft

== Notes ==
Bibliography

- Aircat...Year 'Round!. Lake Hamilton, Florida: Hurricane Fiberglass Products Corp. May 1972. Archived from the original on July 12, 2018.
- Enfield, Samuel; Burr, R.; Badgett, R., eds. (April 15, 1966). Airboats (PDF) (Technical report). San Francisco: Army Concept Team in Vietnam. R-1590.0. Archived from the original (PDF) on August 3, 2020 – via DTIC.
- Kelly, Francis J. (1973). Vietnam Studies: U.S. Army Special Forces 1961–1971 (PDF). Washington, DC: Department of the Army. ISBN 978-1944961947. CMH Pub 90-23-1. Archived from the original (PDF) on September 20, 2015.
- Stanton, Shelby L. (June 15, 2008). Special Forces at War: An Illustrated History, Southeast Asia 1957–1975. Voyageur Press. ISBN 9781610601344.
- Wollner, James Parker (2007). The Bamboo Shoot. Bloomington, Indiana: Xlibris Corporation. ISBN 978-1-4134-5338-6.
