= Danville Airport (disambiguation) =

Danville Airport may refer to:

- Danville Airport (FAA: 8N8) in Danville, Pennsylvania, United States
- Danville Municipal Airport (FAA: 32A) in Danville, Arkansas, United States
- Danville Regional Airport (FAA: DAN) in Danville, Virginia, United States

Other airports in places named Danville:

- Stuart Powell Field (FAA: DVK) in Danville, Kentucky, United States
- Vermilion Regional Airport (FAA: DNV) in Danville, Illinois, United States
