= Basilica of Saints Cyril and Methodius (Danville, Pennsylvania) =

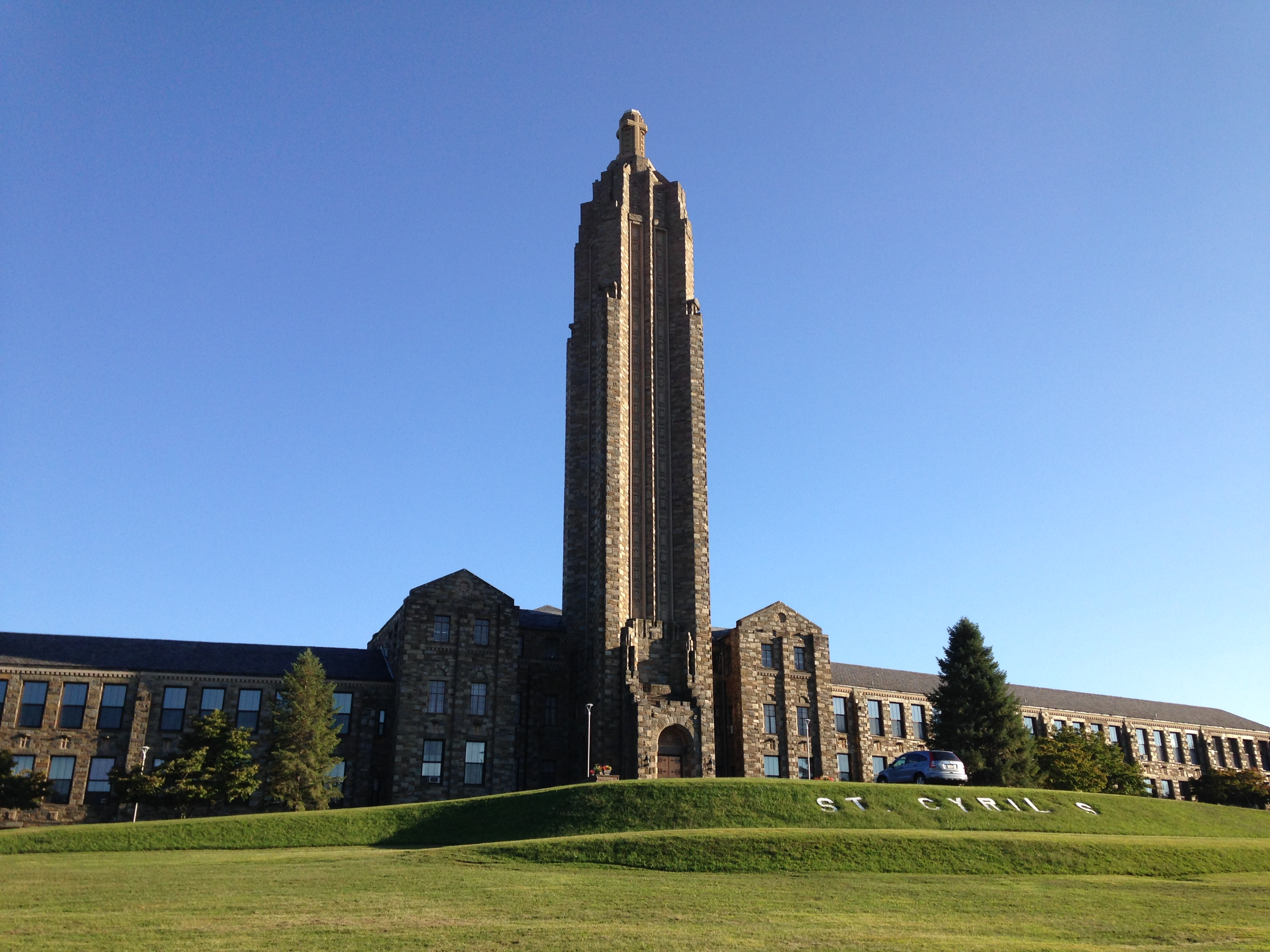

- Location in Pennsylvania
- 40°57′46″N 76°36′10″W
- Location: 580 Railroad St. Danville, Pennsylvania
- Country: United States
- Denomination: Roman Catholic Church

History
- Dedicated: October 17, 1939

Architecture
- Style: Romanesque Revival
- Completed: 1939

Specifications
- Materials: Stone

The Basilica of Saints Cyril and Methodius is a Minor Basilica of the Catholic Church located in Danville, Pennsylvania, United States within the Diocese of Harrisburg. It is primarily the convent chapel of the Sisters of Saints Cyril and Methodius at their motherhouse, Villa Sacred Heart.

== History ==
The sisters built their chapel during the Great Depression. The sisters were largely the daughters of European peasants and working-class immigrants. The people whose donations paid for the chapel were similar people who worked in coal mines, steel mills, factories, and farms. The Romanesque Revival chapel was dedicated on October 17, 1939. It was extensively renovated in 1989. Pope John Paul II decreed on June 30, 1989 that Saints Cyril and Methodius chapel was elevated to the status of a minor basilica.

== Architecture ==
The basilica serves as the chapel of the larger motherhouse complex. The interior walls are composed of travertine marble, the vaulted ceiling is covered with tiles, and the floors are composed of terrazzo. The altar and baldachino are carved in marble and the pews are oak. The interior also feature life-size mosaics of Saints Cyril and Methodius.

== Image Gallery ==
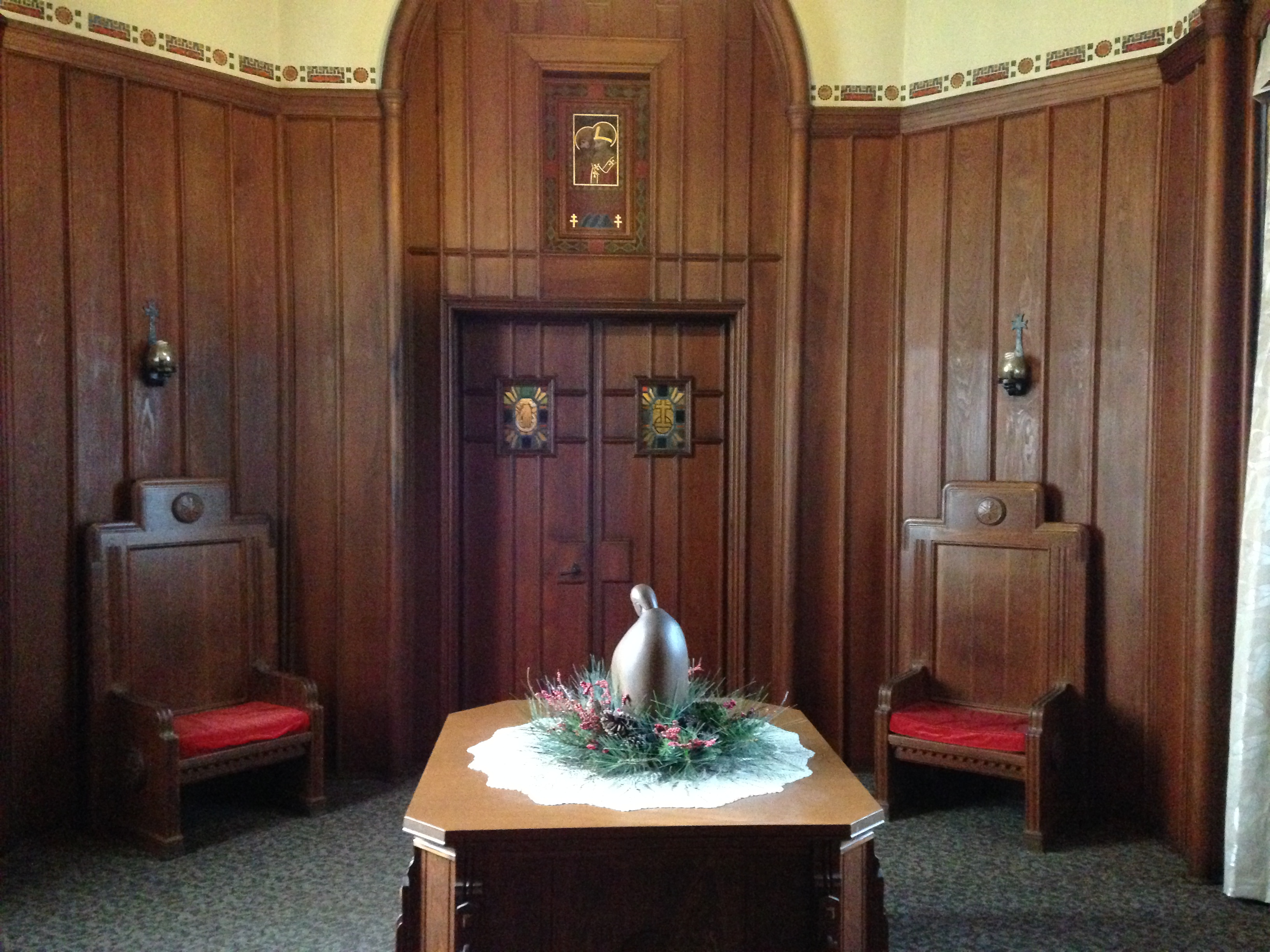
Interior, main foyer

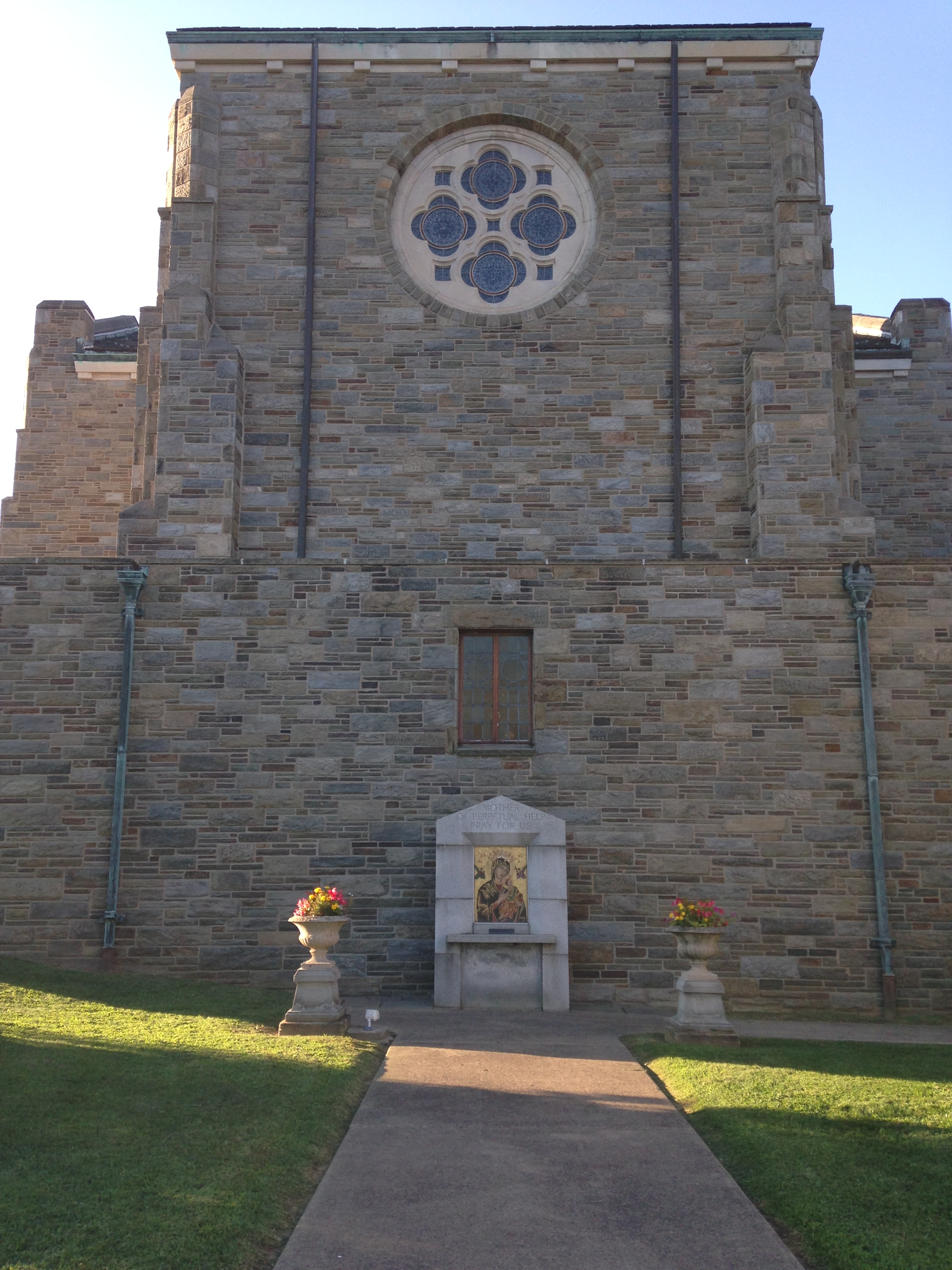
Exterior, basilica rear

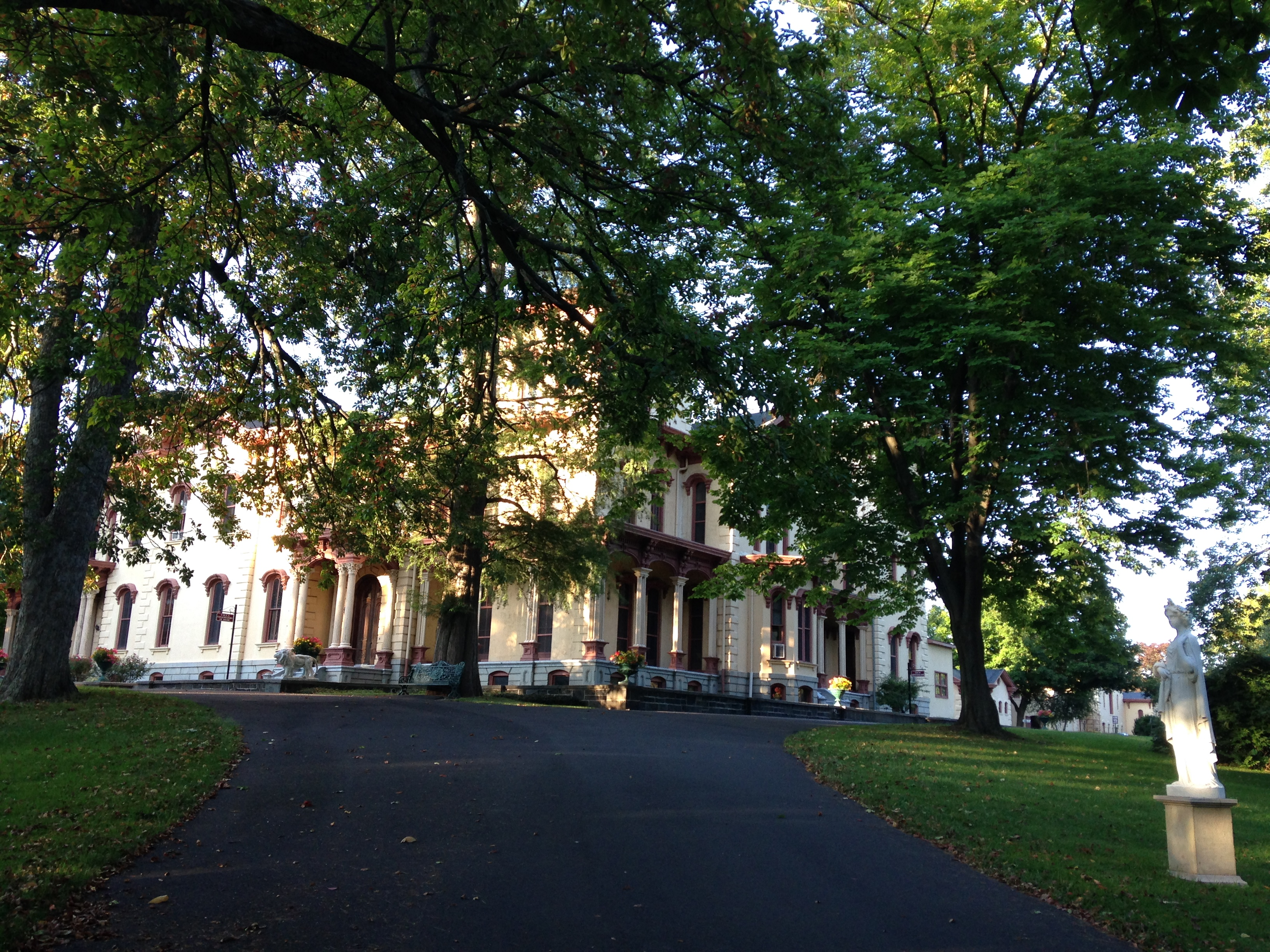
Jankola Library
