= Geisinger Medical Center =

- Geisinger Health System
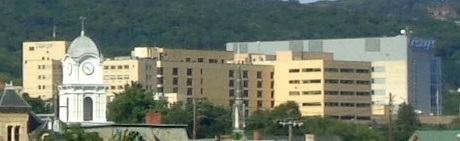
- Geisinger Medical Center in Danville, PA

Geography
- Location: Danville, Pennsylvania, United States
- Coordinates: 40.968°N 76.606°W

Organization
- Type: Regional resource medical center

Services
- Emergency department: Combined Adult Level I / Pediatric Level II
- Beds: 594

Helipads
- Helipad: FAA LID: 79PN; FAA LID: 49PN
Number	Length		Surface
Number	ft	m	Surface
H1 (79PN)	60	18	Roof/top
H1 (49PN)	46	14	Asphalt
H2 (49PN)	47	14	Asphalt/concrete

History
- Former name: George F. Geisinger Memorial Hospital
- Founded: 1915

Links
- Website: geisinger.org
- Lists: Hospitals in Pennsylvania

Geisinger Medical Center (GMC) is an academic medical center in Danville, Pennsylvania that opened in 1915 as the George F. Geisinger Memorial Hospital. It is the flagship hospital for the Danville-based Geisinger Health System, a primary chain of hospitals and clinics across northeastern and central Pennsylvania. Geisinger Medical Center is an adult level I trauma center. Adjoined is the Janet Weis Children's Hospital (JWCH), a pediatric level II trauma center. Geisinger Life Flight, a helicopter medevac system, is based at GMC.

GMC's position in a small town gives Danville one of the highest concentrations of hospital workers in the United States. According to Todd Frankel of The Washington Post, "Life in Danville has always seemed to revolve around what some locals call the 'Big G,' the hospital on the hill that employs more than 10,000 people in a borough of 4,600."

== History ==
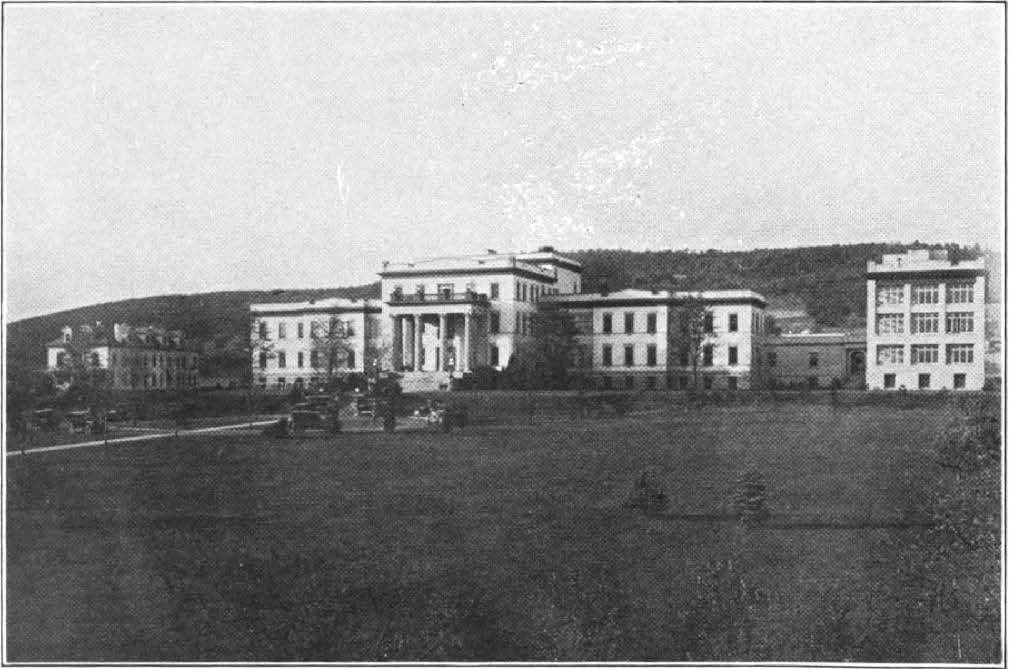
George F. Geisinger Memorial Hospital c. 1928

Abigail Geisinger founded the hospital in December 1915, then named the George F. Geisinger Memorial Hospital after her late husband. In 1928, a surgical pavilion was added. In 1961, it was reorganized as Geisinger Medical Center.

=== Hospital for Advanced Medicine ===
On February 9, 2010, Geisinger Medical Center opened the Hospital for Advanced Medicine (HfAM).

- HfAM 8 Medicine/Surgery with Telemetry - Opened in 2010, this floor provides general medical and surgical care to patients who are in need of telemetry.
- HfAM 7 Acuity Adaptable Care Unit - Opened in 2010, this floor focuses on patient care related to cardiac surgery, extracorporeal membrane oxygenation (ECMO), and thoracic surgery. Since 2015 Geisinger Medical Center is a certified Extracorporeal Life Support Organization (ELSO) center for supporting patients requiring ECMO.
- HfAM 6 Orthopaedic Surgery - Opened in 2013, this floor focuses on inpatient post-orthopedic and surgical care. The floor includes a gymnasium used for inpatient rehabilitation.

=== 2020s expansion ===
Geisinger announced plans for an $880 million expansion to begin in 2025. Plans include all-private patient rooms, an 11-story tower, and expanded emergency room (ER) space. The ER would increase its bed count, and 20 new operating rooms would be added.

== See also ==
- Geisinger Health System
