= Bernard Goldberg (businessman) =

American businessman

- Born: October 25, 1925; Danville, Pennsylvania, U.S.
- Died: August 27, 2010 (aged 84); Syracuse, New York, U.S.
- Occupation: Businessman
- Years active: 1946–2010
- Known for: Founder of Raymour Furniture
- Spouse: Norma Goldberg (m. 1949)
- Children: 4

Bernard Goldberg (October 20, 1925 – August 27, 2010) was an American businessperson who co-founded the furniture retailer Raymour Furniture (which later became Raymour & Flanigan) in 1946 with his brother, Arnold Goldberg.

== Biography ==
=== Early life ===
Goldberg graduated from Nottingham High School in Syracuse, New York before enrolling at Princeton University. He dropped out of Princeton in order to enlist in the United States Army during World War II. He was sent to France and Germany in the infantry during the war and was a recipient of the Bronze Star Medal. He returned to New York following the end of World War II, where he received a bachelor's degree from Syracuse University in 1948.

=== Raymour & Flanigan ===
Bernard and Arnold Goldberg opened the first Raymour Furniture in 1946 in Syracuse, New York. They did not name their new store "Goldberg" because another store in the city owned by their relatives already used their surname. Instead, the brothers named their furniture store after an antiques shop in Long Island which was owned and operated by another brother. Under Goldberg's ownership, the two brothers opened a second store in Clay, New York, in 1972. The company acquired Flanigan's Furniture in 1990, which operated fourteen stores in upstate New York at the time. The acquisition gave the company its present name, Raymour & Flanigan.

Bernard Goldberg remained the chairperson of Raymour & Flanigan until his death in 2010. However, he suffered from deteriorating health, including Alzheimer's disease during the later years of his life. His two sons - Raymour & Flanigan President and CEO Neil Goldberg and Executive Vice President Steve Goldberg, as well as his nephew, Executive Vice President Michael Goldberg, succeeded him.

Additionally, Goldberg was a founding member of the Syracuse Jewish Community Foundation of Central New York and was a member of the board of directors for the New York State Division of Human Rights.

== Death ==
Bernard Goldberg died in Syracuse on August 27, 2010, of complications from Alzheimer's disease, aged 84. He was survived by his wife, Norma, three sons, one daughter and eleven grandchildren.
