= Theodore L. Kramer =

American Civil War soldier

- Born: c. 1847; Luzerne County, Pennsylvania
- Died: March 2, 1910
- Burial place: Elmhurst, Illinois
- Military career
- Allegiance: United States of America
- Branch: United States Army
- Rank: Private
- Units: Company G, 188th Pennsylvania Infantry
- Conflicts: Battle of Chaffin's Farm; American Civil War
- Awards: Medal of Honor

Theodore L. Kramer (c. 1847 – March 2, 1910) was an American soldier who fought in the American Civil War. Kramer received his country's highest award for bravery during combat, the Medal of Honor. Kramer's medal was won for his actions in the Battle of Chaffin's Farm, Virginia, on September 29, 1864. He was honored with the award on April 6, 1865.

Kramer was born in Luzerne County, Pennsylvania, and entered service in Danville. He was buried in Elmhurst, Illinois.

== Medal of Honor citation ==
The President of the United States of America, in the name of Congress, takes pleasure in presenting the Medal of Honor to Private Theodore L. Kramer, United States Army, for extraordinary heroism on 29 September 1864, while serving with Company G, 188th Pennsylvania Infantry, in action at Chapin's Farm, Virginia. Private Kramer took one of the first prisoners, a captain.

== See also ==
- List of American Civil War Medal of Honor recipients: G–L
