= Gwladys F. Hughes =

American educator (1907–1996)

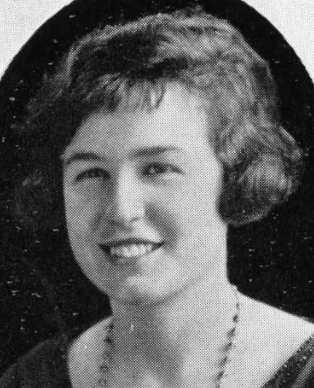
- Gwladys F. Hughes, from the 1926 yearbook of Goucher College
- Born: May 26, 1907; Danville, Pennsylvania, U.S.
- Died: March 15, 1996 (aged 88); San Bernardino, California, U.S.
- Other names: Gwladys Hughes Simon, Gwladys Simon
- Occupations: Educator, anthropologist, folklorist

Gwladys F. Hughes Simon (May 26, 1907 – March 15, 1996) was an American educator and folklorist employed by the United States Department of State for much of her career. She worked in Japan after World War II, educating the children of American military and civilian personnel in the United States Occupational Forces. She collected folktales and riddles while teaching in Sri Lanka and Micronesia in the 1950s.

== Early life and education ==
Hughes was from Danville, Pennsylvania, the daughter of John R. Hughes and Flora Emma Rockafeller Hughes. Her father was born in Wales. She graduated from Danville High School and Goucher College, and was a member of Kappa Kappa Gamma. She earned a master's degree in biology at Cornell University. She made further studies at the University of Arizona, between overseas assignments in 1958.

== Career ==
Hughes was a hospital recreation worker with the American Red Cross in France during World War II. She taught in Hawaii from 1945 to 1947, then went to Tokyo to work as a teacher in the United States Occupation Forces there. In 1949 she was Women's Affairs Officer and chief of the Civil Education Section of the U. S. Civil Affairs Committee, based in Nagasaki.

Hughes lived in Kundasale, Sri Lanka from 1951 to 1953, working as superintendent of an agricultural school for girls, on a grant from the United States. In the mid-1950s, she spoke to Pennsylvania community groups about her experiences in Ceylon. From 1957 to 1958, she was based in the Yap district in Micronesia, training teachers. "I find that folklore projects help me to establish rapport with local people where I am working, and it helps to get conflicting interests and individuals working together," she explained in a 1958 interview.

In the 1960s, she taught high school and adult education courses in Barstow, California.

== Publications ==
Hughes published her research in academic journals including Journal of American Folklore, Western Folklore, and Asian Folklore Studies.

- "Folk Beliefs and Customs in an Hawaiian Community" (1949)
- Rhymes Sung by Japanese Children" (1951)
- "The Enkiri Enoki (Divorce Nettle Tree)" (1951)
- "Folk Beliefs from Hawaii" (1952)
- "Five Tamil Riddles" (1952)
- "Sinhalese Riddles" (1952)
- "Some Japanese Beliefs and Home Remedies" (1952)
- "A Handful of Japanese Proverbs" (1953)
- "Japanese Riddles" (1953)
- "Tongue-Twister Sentences" (1953)
- "Beliefs and Customs Reported by Students at Tokyo American School" (1953)
- "Riddles from Ceylon" (1955)
- "Proverbs from Ceylon about Animals" (1956, with S. A. Wijayatilake)
- "More Riddles from Ceylon" (1957)
- "Jankenpoi in Hawaii" (1959)
- "Riddles from Hawaii" (1959)
- "Beliefs Common in Ceylon" (1960)
- "The 'Lucky Impostor' in Ceylon" (1970)
- "A Collection of Yapese Riddles" (1977)

== Personal life ==
Hughes married Elmore E. Simon in Hawaii in 1950. They divorced in 1953. She died in 1996, at the age of 88, in San Bernardino, California.
