= Danville, Pennsylvania =

Borough in Pennsylvania, US

- Borough
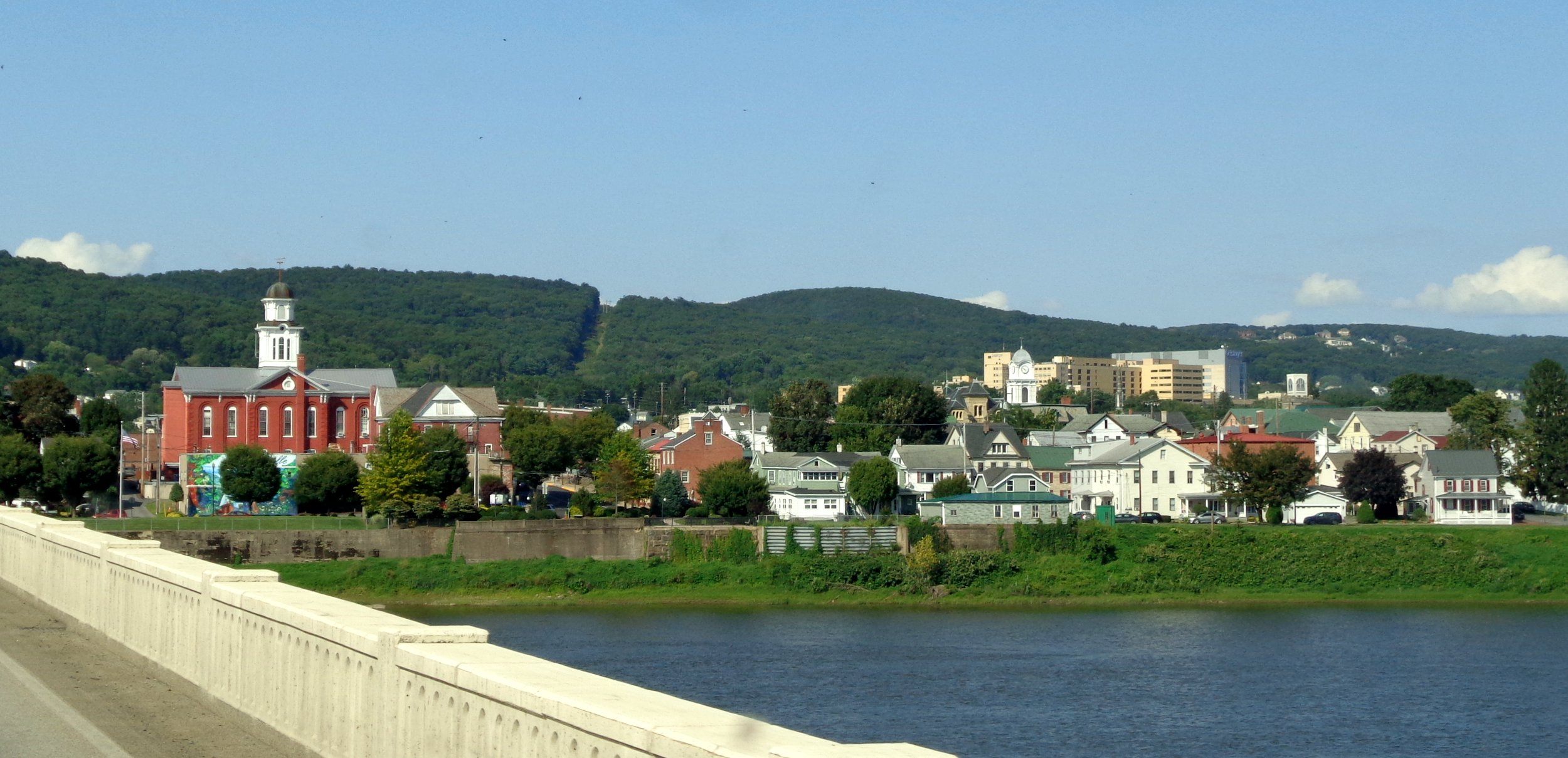
- Central Danville view from Mill Street Bridge
- Nicknames: Ironmen Country, D-Block
- Location of Danville in Montour County, Pennsylvania.

- Location within the U.S. state of Pennsylvania Danville (the United States)
- Coordinates: 40°57′42″N 76°36′43″W
- Country: United States
- State: Pennsylvania
- County: Montour
- Settled: 1792
- Incorporated (borough): February 1849
- Named for: Daniel Montgomery

Government
  - Mayor: Scott Richardson (Republican)

Area
  - Total: 1.58 sq mi (4.08 km^{2})
  - Land: 1.56 sq mi (4.03 km^{2})
  - Water: 0.019 sq mi (0.05 km^{2})
- Elevation (center of borough): 460 ft (140 m)
- Highest elevation (northwestern borough boundary): 1,110 ft (340 m)
- Lowest elevation (Susquehanna River and Mahoning Creek confluence): 438 ft (134 m)

Population (2020)
  - Total: 4,239
  - Density: 2,725.2/sq mi (1,052.21/km^{2})
- Time zone: Eastern (EST)
  - Summer (DST): EDT
- ZIP code: 17821 17822
- Area code: 570
- FIPS code: 42-18136
- Website: danvilleboro.org

Danville is a borough in and the county seat of Montour County, Pennsylvania, United States, along the North Branch of the Susquehanna River. The population was 4,221 at the 2020 census. Danville is part of the Bloomsburg-Berwick micropolitan area.

Danville is the home of Geisinger Medical Center, a trauma center employing over 10,000 people.

== History ==
=== Native American history ===
As Europeans explored the coastal regions reachable from ships at the dawn of the 17th Century, the whole valley of the Susquehanna from South-central New York state to the upper Chesapeake Bay was owned by the fierce Susquehannock people, like the Erie people, an Iroquoian speaking tribe with a similar related culture. As the European wars of religion lulled before the cataclysm of the Thirty Years' War, ca. 1600 AD the protestant Dutch traders first entered the Delaware Valley and began regularly trading firearms for furs, especially highly valued beaver pelts with the inland Susquehannock people in the vicinity of greater Philadelphia.

Although the Susquehannocks lived well inland their hunting range owned the rich Beaver territory of the entire Susquehanna River drainage basin, since the Susquehannock's range also included hunting the Schuylkill and Lehigh Rivers and their tributaries (which they historically disputed by occasional mutual raiding with the Algonquian Delaware people dwelling along the Atlantic coastal strip extending west from Delaware and southern New Jersey into the Poconos), the Susquehanna had a wealth of coveted Beaver pelts, and so became formidably well armed.

=== The Beaver Wars ===
About the time New Sweden (1638) was founded, the Haudenosaunee Confederacy began a series of escalating wars setting Indian versus Indian called the Beaver Wars—that ultimately would open up the frontier to white settlers—deadly long running territorial wars between Amerindian peoples for fur hunting and trapping territories. Forearmed by their traders knowledge, the Swedes settled both sides of the Delaware, and almost immediately became allies with the Susquehannock, who already well armed, would soon after have a confederacy well armed enough to win a war declared by the colonial Province of Maryland, subjugate several Delaware tribes and would inflict several stinging defeats on Haudenosaunee forces.

By the mid-1650s New Netherlands absorbed New Sweden, and in 1666-67, the English took over New Netherlands, but most of the colonial populations in both cases, including traders, merely switched governors and went on with business as usual, where the most lucrative business was for furs.

What little is known of the Susquehannock tribe comes mostly from a few traders and the work of a single Dutch missionary who lived with them for a time about 1640. They were a fierce and powerful people holding off territorial infringements from the tribes on all sides of their range from the Potomac to the Mohawk valley, and the Poconos to the Alleghenies. Danville, located in the southern center of the valley would have been at least a summer hunting camp for these people, who were to become horribly affected by epidemic plagues of disease over multiple years circa 1668-72. This sudden weakness in population ironically occurred shortly after the Susquehannocks gave a serious drubbing about 1665-66 over 2-3 years to two of the Five Nations of the Haudenosaunee in the local Beaver Wars. After the drastic weakening, they were attacked on all sides by subjected tribes, colonists, and the Haudenosaunee, suffering further large losses.

By 1678, the Haudenosaunee would agree in a treaty to absorb most of the remaining Iroquoian Susquehannocks whose civilization had collapsed, though several hundred remnants migrated to live south and west of the Wyoming Valley, and would be called the Conestoga by the new English settlers in the colony of Pennsylvania, whilst the Susquehannock confederation would go extinct as an Iroquoian people and its surviving people would be absorbed into other tribes. Hence, Danville was Haudenosaunee land until a 1768 treaty after the French and Indian War.

=== 16th-18th century ===
In November 1773, William Montgomery began acquiring land in Northumberland County from J. Cummings. On November 26, 1774 he acquired 180 acres along Mahoning Creek and Susquehanna River known as "Karkaase" from J. Simpson. Following his service in the New York and New Jersey Campaign, William re-settled his family from Chester County to Northumberland. Originally referred to as "Montgomery's Landing", it would become known as Danville after his son, Daniel Montgomery. After developing his farm, William developed the first gristmill, sawmill, and trading post. In 1778, his family fled during the Big Runaway to Fort Augusta and returned following the Battle of Wyoming. In 1792, William constructed the General William Montgomery House. In the same year Daniel plotted the area between Mill Street and Church Street, the historic core of the town which now bears his name.

=== Early 19th century ===
Danville was part of Northumberland County, Pennsylvania, when it was founded. In 1813, Columbia County, Pennsylvania was formed from part of Northumberland Co. Danville became the county seat of Columbia Co. until 1845, when an election moved the seat to Bloomsburg, Pennsylvania. In 1850, Montour County was formed from part of Columbia. Danville then became the county seat of Montour.

Danville became a transportation center in the mid-19th century as the technology of early railroads developed, allowing accelerated development of inland communities. Danville first serviced canal boats plying the navigations on the Susquehanna between the coal docks in Pittston and Wilkes-Barre connecting to the Union Canal, and Harrisburg. Subsequently, it became served by several railroads also running along the banks of the North Branch of the Susquehanna River. Railroads helped local businesses expand their sales as they supplied major cities outside of Danville. Coal and iron mines in the surrounding hills and mountains fueled the local economy, and by mid-century Danville was an important iron mill town. Many of the rails of the nation's expanding railroad system were made in Danville, an important contribution to a network which grew explosively for decades. By the 1890s there were 7-8 major railroads running into the Wyoming Valley for Anthracite. A local marker claims that the first T-rail rolled in the United States was rolled in Danville, on October 8, 1845 at the Montour Iron Company, though this is claimed for Mount Savage, Maryland, as well.

=== Late 19th century ===
Montour and several other enormous iron mills dominated the town for most of the 19th century and the iron industry was the chief employer in the region. The iron mills fell into decline, however, as steel replaced iron in the 20th century. The city celebrates this era with an annual Iron Heritage Festival in July, and the main street is still named "Mill Street".

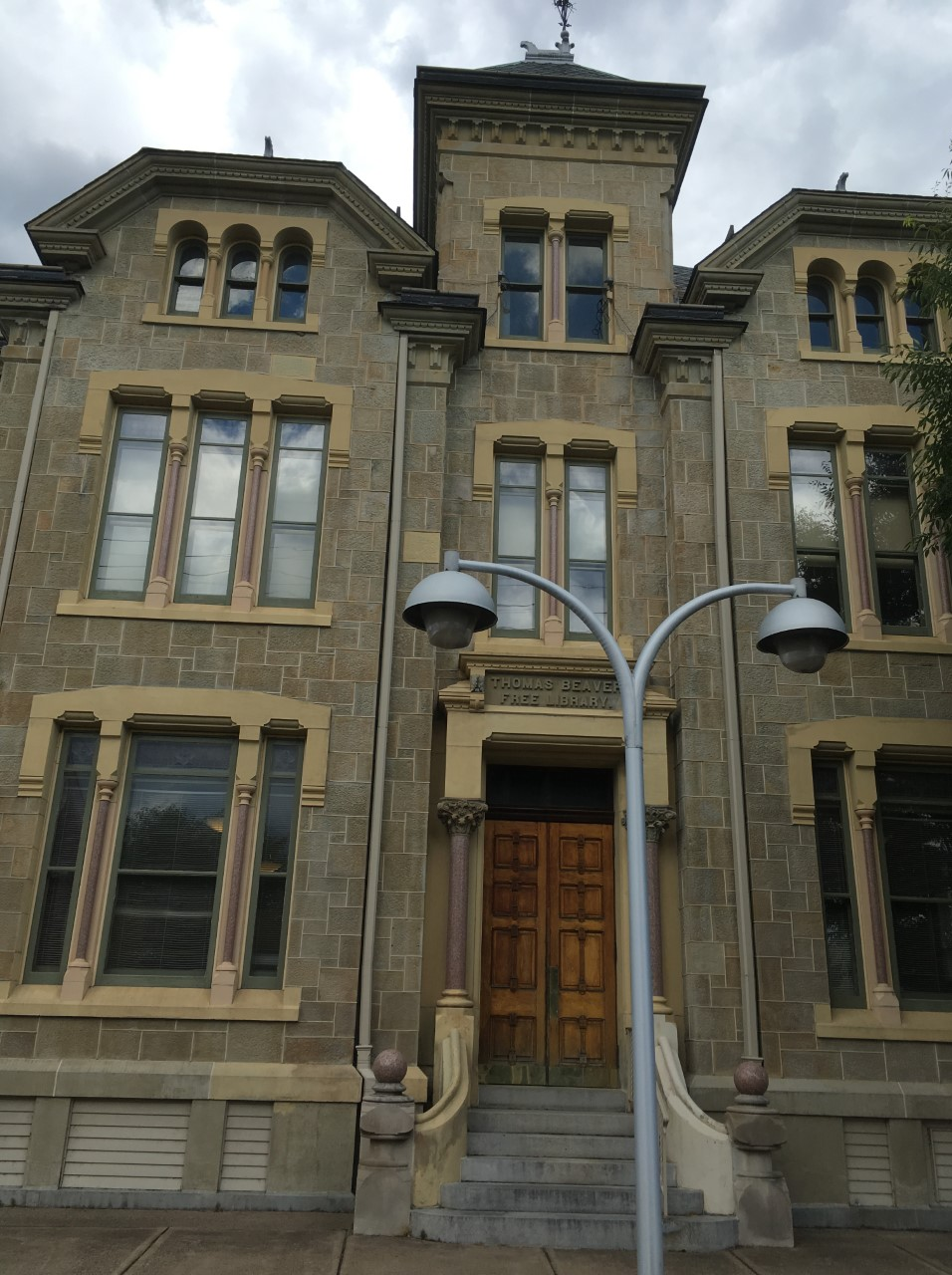
Thomas Beaver Free Library

In 1869 the Danville State Hospital was built as a state institution for the treatment and care of the mentally ill.

=== 20th century and beyond ===
Abigail Geisinger, widow of iron magnate George Geisinger, used his fortune to build a hospital and clinic intended to be a regional medical center modeled after the Mayo Clinic. The Geisinger Hospital was completed in 1915, and has grown over the years. Today, the Geisinger Medical Center is the most important tertiary referral center in northern Pennsylvania. Geisinger and its affiliated institutions are also one of the largest employers in the region.

In the early 1960s, local company Susquehanna Danville Airport produced airboats for evaluation by the U.S. Army. Susquehanna was a joint venture between Ken Burrows-owned Danville Airport of Danville and Mari-Mar Industries of Port Trevorton, Pennsylvania. The airboats, called Susquehanna Skimmers, were evaluated in Vietnam between June 1964 and late 1965. The six Skimmers competed with six Hurricane Aircats, made by the Hurricane Fiberglass Products Company of Auburndale, Florida. The Skimmer lost to the Aircat, which was found to be more durable, easier to maneuver, and have greater obstacle crossing capabilities than the Susquehanna Skimmer, although the Skimmer outperformed the Aircat in deep water.

The Thomas Beaver Free Library and Danville YMCA, Danville Historic District, Danville West Market Street Historic District, and General William Montgomery House are listed on the National Register of Historic Places.

In 2014, Republican Bernie Swank replaced Democrat Ed Coleman as Mayor. Coleman was Mayor of Danville for 16 years. Swank defeated Democrat Tom Graham by 50 votes out of 682 votes cast. She previously served as mayor from 1989 to 1996.

On January 22, 2022, a truck carrying about 100 lab monkeys collided with a dump truck along Route 54 near Danville, allowing four monkeys to escape. Three monkeys were later euthanized, while another remains missing. The truck was bound for a Centers for Disease Control (CDC) facility, leading to fears of a disease outbreak; several witnesses reported symptoms following their contact with the monkeys and were advised to quarantine by the CDC.

== Geography ==
Danville is located in northeastern Pennsylvania at 40°57′42″N 76°36′43″W (40.961607, -76.611947). It is located on the north bank of the North Branch of the Susquehanna River. The contiguous community south of the river is Riverside. The surrounding country is low mountain ridges of the Appalachian range. The town is bisected by U.S. Route 11 and has an exit from Interstate 80 to the north. There are also deposits of limestone in the vicinity.

According to the United States Census Bureau, the borough has a total area of 1.6 square miles (4.1 km^{2}), all land.

== Demographics ==
Historical population
Census	Pop.	Note	%±
1850	3,302		—
1860	6,385		93.4%
1870	8,436		32.1%
1880	8,346		−1.1%
1890	7,998		−4.2%
1900	8,042		0.6%
1910	7,517		−6.5%
1920	6,952		−7.5%
1930	7,185		3.4%
1940	7,122		−0.9%
1950	6,994		−1.8%
1960	6,889		−1.5%
1970	6,176		−10.3%
1980	5,239		−15.2%
1990	5,165		−1.4%
2000	4,897		−5.2%
2010	4,699		−4.0%
2020	4,239		−9.8%
2021 (est.)	4,200	▼	−0.9%

=== 2020 census ===
As of the 2020 census, Danville had a population of 4,239. The median age was 36.2 years. 19.4% of residents were under the age of 18 and 17.2% of residents were 65 years of age or older. For every 100 females there were 86.3 males, and for every 100 females age 18 and over there were 84.5 males age 18 and over.

100.0% of residents lived in urban areas, while 0.0% lived in rural areas.

There were 2,109 households in Danville, of which 22.7% had children under the age of 18 living in them. Of all households, 30.5% were married-couple households, 23.7% were households with a male householder and no spouse or partner present, and 37.6% were households with a female householder and no spouse or partner present. About 45.3% of all households were made up of individuals and 15.0% had someone living alone who was 65 years of age or older.

There were 2,338 housing units, of which 9.8% were vacant. The homeowner vacancy rate was 2.5% and the rental vacancy rate was 9.0%.

Racial composition as of the 2020 census
Race	Number	Percent
White	3,615	85.3%
Black or African American	101	2.4%
American Indian and Alaska Native	13	0.3%
Asian	181	4.3%
Native Hawaiian and Other Pacific Islander	0	0.0%
Some other race	58	1.4%
Two or more races	271	6.4%
Hispanic or Latino (of any race)	211	5.0%

=== 2010 census ===
As of the census of 2010, there were 4,697 people, 2,173 households, and 1,148 families residing in the borough. The population density was 2,936.9 inhabitants per square mile (1,133.9/km^{2}). There were 2,527 housing units at an average density of 1,579.4 per square mile (609.8/km^{2}). The racial makeup of the borough was 94.2% White, 0.4% African American, 0% Native American, 3.60% Asian, 0.4% from other races, and 1.4% from two or more races. Hispanic or Latino of any race were 3.7% of the population.

In the borough the age distribution of the population showed 20.3% age 19 and under, 5.5% from 20 to 24, 26.1% from 25 to 44, 28.2% from 45 to 64, and 19.9% who were 65 years of age or older. The median age was 39 years. For every 100 females, there were 81.9 males.

The median income for a household in the borough was $37,238, and the median income for a family was $44,955. Males had a median income of $38,194 versus $29,735 for females. The per capita income for the borough was $21,344. 18.5% of the population and 12.2% of families were below the poverty line. 33.9% of those under the age of 18 and 15.2% of those 65 and older were living below the poverty line.

=== 2000 census ===
As of the census of 2000, there were 4,897 people, 2,277 households, and 1,238 families residing in the borough. The population density was 3,087.2 inhabitants per square mile (1,192.0/km^{2}). There were 2,523 housing units at an average density of 1,590.5 per square mile (614.1/km^{2}). The racial makeup of the borough was 96.06% White, 0.78% African American, 0.12% Native American, 1.80% Asian, 0.47% from other races, and 0.78% from two or more races. Hispanic or Latino of any race were 1.14% of the population.

There were 2,277 households, out of which 24.1% had children under the age of 18 living with them, 39.4% were married couples living together, 12.3% had a female householder with no husband present, and 45.6% were non-families. 40.3% of all households were made up of individuals, and 16.6% had someone living alone who was 65 years of age or older. The average household size was 2.10 and the average family size was 2.84.

In the borough the age distribution of the population showed 21.7% under the age of 18, 7.6% from 18 to 24, 31.2% from 25 to 44, 20.0% from 45 to 64, and 19.4% who were 65 years of age or older. The median age was 38 years. For every 100 females, there were 84.0 males. For every 100 females age 18 and over, there were 79.1 males.

The median income for a household in the borough was $30,498, and the median income for a family was $38,778. Males had a median income of $30,375 versus $24,313 for females. The per capita income for the borough was $16,693. 10.6% of the population and 6.0% of families were below the poverty line. 16.1% of those under the age of 18 and 8.4% of those 65 and older were living below the poverty line.

== Education ==
Danville Area School District is the local public education agency. There is also a K–8 Catholic School, St. Joseph School, in Danville.

== Recreation ==
The borough council is a partner of the Montour Area Recreation Commission. They hope to attract state funding to study recreational opportunities along the Susquehanna River. Hess Field is a park located on Meadow Lane.

The Montour Area Recreation Commission (MARC) led a local volunteer effort to clear the abandoned towpath of the North Branch Canal along the Susquehanna River. A mile of the towpath was cleared, permitting biking, walking and running near the Danville Soccer Park. The canal is over 200 years old. It was an important part of the region's transportation system. Canal boats and rafts moved farm produce, lumber and people up and down the river. This is part of a greenway effort to develop recreation and commercial opportunities along the river. The long-term vision is to create a regional trail that connects Northumberland to Catawissa and on to Bloomsburg, Pennsylvania.

Running through the outskirts of Danville, the J. Manley Robbins trail is alleged to be the oldest documented rail-trail in the United States. The former railroad line for the "Montour," a 10-ton narrow gauge locomotive used for carrying iron ore between deposits and furnaces, the line was converted to a bicycle path in 1890s. The original one mile railbed trail section now connects with adjacent additional trails and recreation amenities near the Mahoning Creek.

== Nearby communities ==
- Riverside
- Mechanicsville
- Mausdale

== Notable people ==
- Barbara Babcock (1943–2016), cultural studies professor
- JJ Bleday (born 1997), baseball player
- Alice Dalton Brown (born 1939), realist painter
- John Wilson Bubb (1843–1922), US Army brigadier general
- Jacob Coxey, socialist and populist American politician, and minor party candidate for the office of President of the United States. Was the leader of Coxey's Army, considered to be the first significant protest march on Washington, D.C.
- Elizabeth Currid-Halkett a University of Southern California professor and internationally recognized author attended Danville High School from 1992-1996.
- Bernard Goldberg (1925–2010), co-founder of Raymour & Flanigan
- Gwladys F. Hughes (1907–1996), educator and folklorist
- Keith Kauffman, racing driver
- Theodore L. Kramer (1847–1910), Recipient of the Medal of Honor in the American Civil War. Kramer entered service in Danville.
- John Patterson Lundy (1823–1892), Episcopal priest and writer
- William Montgomery, founder
- Daniel Montgomery, co-founder and namesake
- Joseph Parry, Welsh-born composer of hymn whose song 'Aberystwyth' was adapted into Nkosi Sikelel' iAfrika, a component of the national anthem of South Africa.
- John Nevin Schaeffer, classicist
- Christopher Latham Sholes, inventor of the first practical typewriter and the QWERTY keyboard configuration still in use today.
- Dan Washburn, born in Danville, PA, author of The Forbidden Game: Golf and the Chinese Dream
- William Ward Watkin (1886–1952), American architect, professor and head of the Architecture Department at Rice University.
- Bill Yerrick, baseball player.

== See also ==
- Bloomsburg, Pennsylvania
- Mahoning Creek (Susquehanna River)
- Sechler Run
