= Risant Health =

US not-for-profit healthcare system

- Type: Non-profit
- Industry: Healthcare
- Founded: April 26, 2023; 3 years ago
- Founder: Kaiser Permanente
- Headquarters: Washington, D.C., United States
- Area served: Central North Carolina and northeastern and western Pennsylvania
- Key people: Jaewon Ryu (CEO)
- Owner: Kaiser Permanente
- Number of employees: 39,500
- Subsidiaries: Cone Health; Geisinger Health System
- Website: risanthealth.org

Risant Health, Inc. is a private, nonprofit organization in Washington, D.C., it was created by Kaiser Permanente.

== History ==
On April 26, 2023, the subsidiary Risant Health was founded by Kaiser Permanente for the purpose of acquiring Geisinger Health System. It received a $5 billion investment from it parent company to build "a value-based technology platform, a suite of capabilities to improve how and where patients get their care." On April 2, 2024, it finalized the acquisition of Geisinger Health System, and will invest $2 billion in the hospital network. On June 21, 2024, Risant Health signed a definitive agreement to purchase Cone Health. On December 3, 2024, it finalized the acquisition of Cone Health, and will invest $1 billion in the hospital network.
