= Dan Washburn =

- Born: October 31, 1973 (age 52); Danville, Pennsylvania, U.S.
- Education: Elizabethtown College
- Occupations: Author, journalist
- Spouse: Bliss Khaw
- Writing career
- Language: English
- Notable work: The Forbidden Game: Golf and the Chinese Dream

Daniel Christopher Washburn (born October 31, 1973, Danville, Pennsylvania) is an American writer and journalist. He is the author of The Forbidden Game: Golf and the Chinese Dream, named one of the best books of 2014 by The Financial Times. Washburn is represented by the New York-based literary agent Zoe Pagnamenta.

Washburn has written for Slate, Financial Times Weekend Magazine, The Atlantic, Foreign Policy, Golf World, Golf Digest, ESPN.com, and other publications.

Washburn's work was featured in the 2008 book, Inside The Ropes: Sportswriters Get Their Game On, and the 2013 anthology Unsavory Elements: Stories of Foreigners on the Loose in China.

From 2002 to 2011, Washburn was based in Shanghai, China, where he was known for his various websites. He is founding editor of Shanghaiist, part of the Gothamist network of city websites.

Prior to moving to Shanghai, Washburn was a sports writer for The Times in Gainesville, Georgia. He won the Georgia Sports Writers Association's top prize in outdoors writing four years in a row. In 2001, he was named Georgia's top sports columnist.

Washburn is currently Chief Content Officer at Asia Society in New York City. He lives in Bedford–Stuyvesant, Brooklyn.

== Personal ==
Washburn married Bliss Khaw in 2006. He grew up in Bloomsburg, Pennsylvania. He is a graduate of Elizabethtown College.
