= The Forbidden Game =

2014 book by Dan Washburn

The Forbidden Game: Golf and the Chinese Dream
- Author: Dan Washburn
- Language: English
- Publisher: Oneworld Publications
- Publication date: 2014
- Media type: Various
- Pages: 314
- ISBN: 978-1-85168-948-4 (trade); ISBN 978-1-78074-739-2 (mass market)
- OCLC: 876292441
- Dewey Decimal: 338.47/796352/0951
- LC Class: GV985.C4 W37 2014

The Forbidden Game: Golf and the Chinese Dream is a non-fiction book by Dan Washburn, an American journalist who was based in Shanghai, China from 2002 to 2011. It was published by Oneworld Publications in 2014. In the book, Washburn uses the contradictory emergence of golf as a "metaphor for modern China." The Financial Times named The Forbidden Game one of the best books of 2014.

== Summary ==
In an interview with The New York Times Washburn said the "complex world surrounding" golf "seemed to be, in many ways, a microcosm of the China I was living in." In the book's prologue Washburn writes that the growth of golf in China, where construction of new golf courses is officially banned, is "a barometer" for "the country's rapid economic rise" but that "it is also symbolic of the less glamorous realities of a nation’s awkward and arduous evolution from developing to developed: corruption, environmental neglect, disputes over rural land rights and an ever-widening gap between rich and poor."

According to a review in The Wall Street Journal, Washburn tells his story "through the lives of three protagonists: Zhou, a migrant worker who takes a job as a security guard but strives to become a professional golfer; Wang, a farmer on the tropical island of Hainan—China's Hawaii—who finds a new vocation as a restaurant owner after his land is given over to a golf course; and Martin, a hard-working and foul-mouthed American golf-course contractor."

Washburn has said he wanted the book to "read more like a novel [and] to be alive and character-driven — more show than tell." Washburn reportedly spent more than seven years researching and writing the book.

== Reception ==
The Forbidden Game enjoyed a positive critical reception. In The Wall Street Journal, Edward Chancellor called the book "strikingly original" and "gripping." The Economist, in an unsigned review, said anecdotes in the book "bring China to life in a way that outlandish-but-true statistics … cannot." Jonathan Mirsky, in Literary Review, complimented The Forbidden Game's treatment of "local and high-level Chinese corruption," writing "I know no narrative that surpasses The Forbidden Game in this regard." Simon Kuper, reviewing for the New Statesman, praised the book as "an illuminating portrait of modern China" that offered "a rare insight into ordinary Chinese lives," but noted that Washburn was "a little too fond of detail."

== Honors ==
- 2014 The Financial Times "Best Books of 2014"
