= Abigail Geisinger =

American philanthropist (1827–1921)

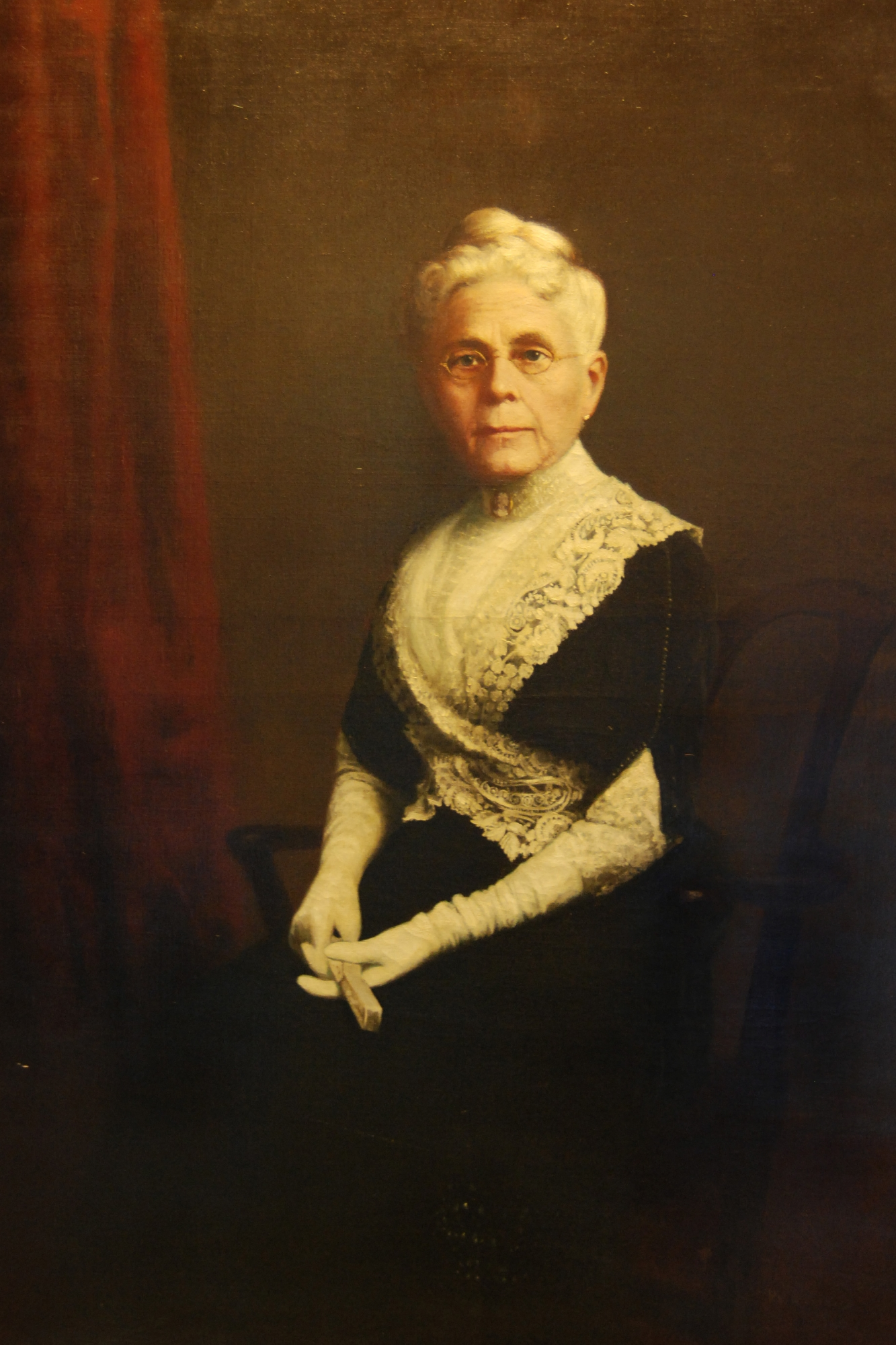
- Portrait of Geisinger by Ben Rhodes
- Born: Abigail Ann Cornelison; January 21, 1827; Catawissa, Pennsylvania, U.S.
- Died: July 8, 1921 (aged 94); Danville, Pennsylvania, U.S.
- Occupation: Philanthropist
- Known for: Founder of Geisinger Medical Center
- Spouses: Jacob Cornelison (died 1865); George F. Geisinger (m. 1866; died 1883)

Abigail Ann Cornelison Geisinger (née Cornelison, January 21, 1827 – July 8, 1921) was an American philanthropist and founder of Geisinger Medical Center.

== Early life ==
Abigail Ann Cornelison was born in 1827 to Isaac Cornelison and Mary Pancoast. Her grandfather, Joseph Cornelison, was an early settler of Danville, Pennsylvania. When Abigail was four months old, her mother Mary died, and Isaac, unable to raise a small child on his own, had her stay with her uncle James Pancoast in Wayne County, Ohio. Abigail moved back to Pennsylvania as a teenager to live with her father, who at this time was working as a wagonmaker in Bloomsburg, Pennsylvania. Isaac died when Mary was sixteen.

== Marriages ==
Abigail married her cousin, Jacob Cornelison, and ran a hotel named the White Swan with him. At the onset of the American Civil War, Jacob was drafted into the Union Army. He died of dysentery June 30, 1865, leaving Abigail widowed.

In 1866, Abigail remarried to George F. Geisinger, a bookkeeper and investor in the local iron industry. Upon his death in 1883, Abigail was widowed a second time and used her elevated financial status to contribute to her community.

George F. Geisinger

== Philanthropy ==
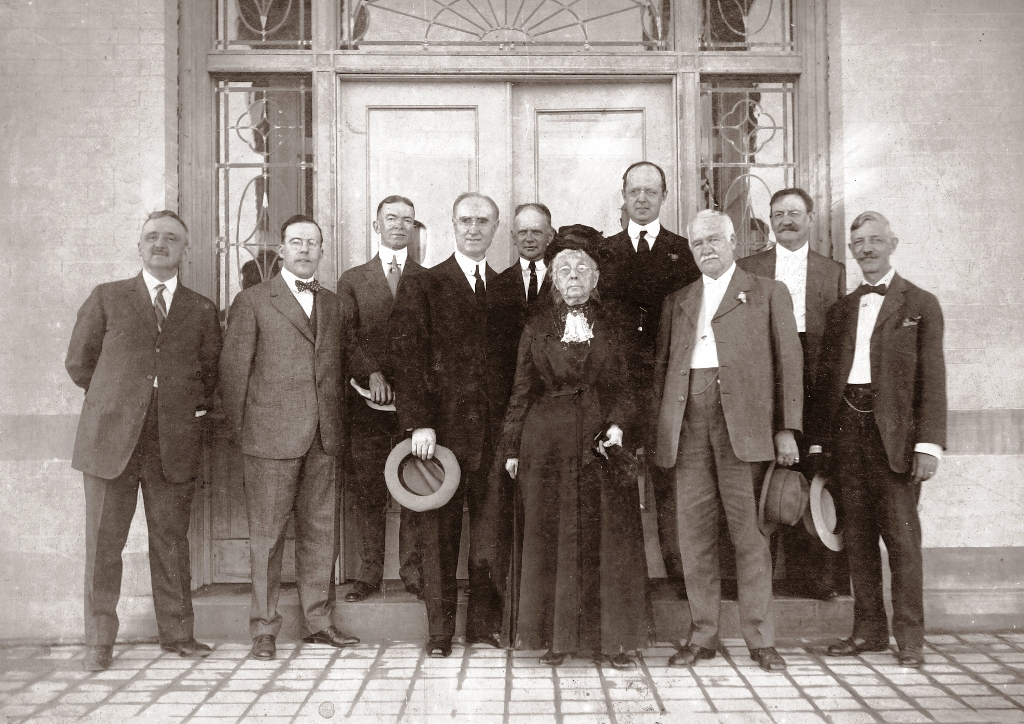
Geisinger with the hospital advisory board, c. 1915

In 1912, Abigail Geisinger purchased 14 acres of land in Danville to build the George F. Geisinger Memorial Hospital. She broke ground on May 1, 1913 and what is now the Geisinger Medical Center was completed in 1915. In addition to the hospital, Abigail donated large amounts of her wealth towards the Danville YMCA, and established a support group for widowed women named the Home for Friendless Women.

== Religion and death ==
Geisinger was a Presbyterian who was an active parishioner of the Mahoning Presbyterian Church. She died at the George F. Geisinger hospital on July 8, 1921, after suffering from a fall three weeks earlier.
