= Raymour & Flanigan =

American retail chain

Raymour & Flanigan Furniture, Inc.
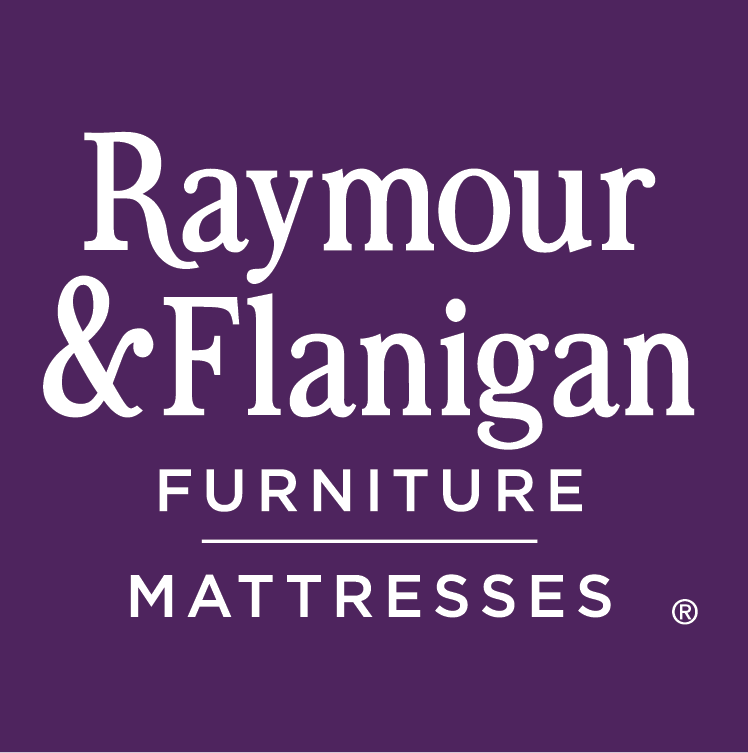
- Trade name: Raymour & Flanigan Furniture and Mattresses
- Type: Private
- Industry: Furnishings
- Founded: 1947; 79 years ago
- Founder: Bernard Goldberg; Arnold Goldberg
- Headquarters: Liverpool, New York, U.S.
- Number of locations: 145
- Key people: Neil Goldberg, Chairman and CEO Steven Goldberg, Vice Chairman Michael Goldberg, Vice Chairman Seth Goldberg, President
- Products: Home Furniture
- Revenue: ▲US$1.2 billion (2021)
- Number of employees: 5,000 (2021)
- Website: www.raymourflanigan.com

Previous logo used by the chain, which was replaced with the current one.

Raymour & Flanigan is a family-owned American furniture retail chain, based in the Northeastern United States.

== Overview ==
Raymour's Furniture Company, the predecessor of Raymour & Flanigan Furniture, was established by brothers Bernard Goldberg and Arnold Goldberg in 1947. Raymour & Flanigan Furniture | Mattresses is the largest furniture retailer in the Northeast and the seventh largest in the U.S.

== History ==
Bernard Goldberg and his younger brother, Arnold Goldberg, co-founded the first Raymour's Furniture store, the predecessor of Raymour & Flanigan, in 1947 in downtown Syracuse, New York. The brothers named the furniture store after an antiques shop on Long Island which a third brother owned.

In 1972, Bernard and Arnold Goldberg opened a second Raymour's Furniture store in Clay, New York, during which time Bernard Goldberg's son, Neil, joined the family-owned company. Neil's brother Steven Goldberg and cousin Michael Goldberg joined the company 5 years later in 1977.

In 1990, Raymour's Furniture Company acquired Flanigan's Furniture, which operated fourteen stores in the Buffalo and Rochester areas. The acquisition gave Raymour & Flanigan its present name.

In 1997, Raymour & Flanigan acquired Furniture Unlimited, which gave the company footing in the Philadelphia and Southern New Jersey markets.

By 2005, the company had begun to focus on expanding its presence in the New York metropolitan area by acquiring Futurama, a furniture retailer with three stores. In 2007, Raymour & Flanigan purchased Alpert's Furniture, located in the Rhode Island and Southeastern Massachusetts area. In December 2008, Raymour & Flanigan Furniture acquired 18 Levitz Furniture store locations in the New York metro area.

The company launched the in-house Leadership Development Institute (LDI) in 2007, which offers workshops for idea generation, learning, and leadership.

By 2011, the company had 100 stores across seven states in the Northeast. As of 2019, Raymour & Flanigan has expanded to over 140 retail locations in the Northeastern U.S. In 2016 they introduced a new concept called Raymour & Flanigan Outlet with two new locations in Philadelphia with the goal of providing a wider range of price points and affordability to consumers. In 2022, Raymour & Flanigan opened its eighth store in New York City and 26th store in the New York City metro area. That same year they expanded into central Pennsylvania with the addition of three new stores. They currently operate over 30 Outlet stores throughout the Northeast.

In January 2021 Raymour & Flanigan announced Seth Goldberg, a third-generation family business member, as the company's new president. Former president and CEO Neil Goldberg became chairman and CEO, while executive vice presidents Steven and Michael Goldberg became vice-chairmen.

In 2021, Raymour & Flanigan added 300 employees and invested more than $25 million in capital expenditures.

== Products ==
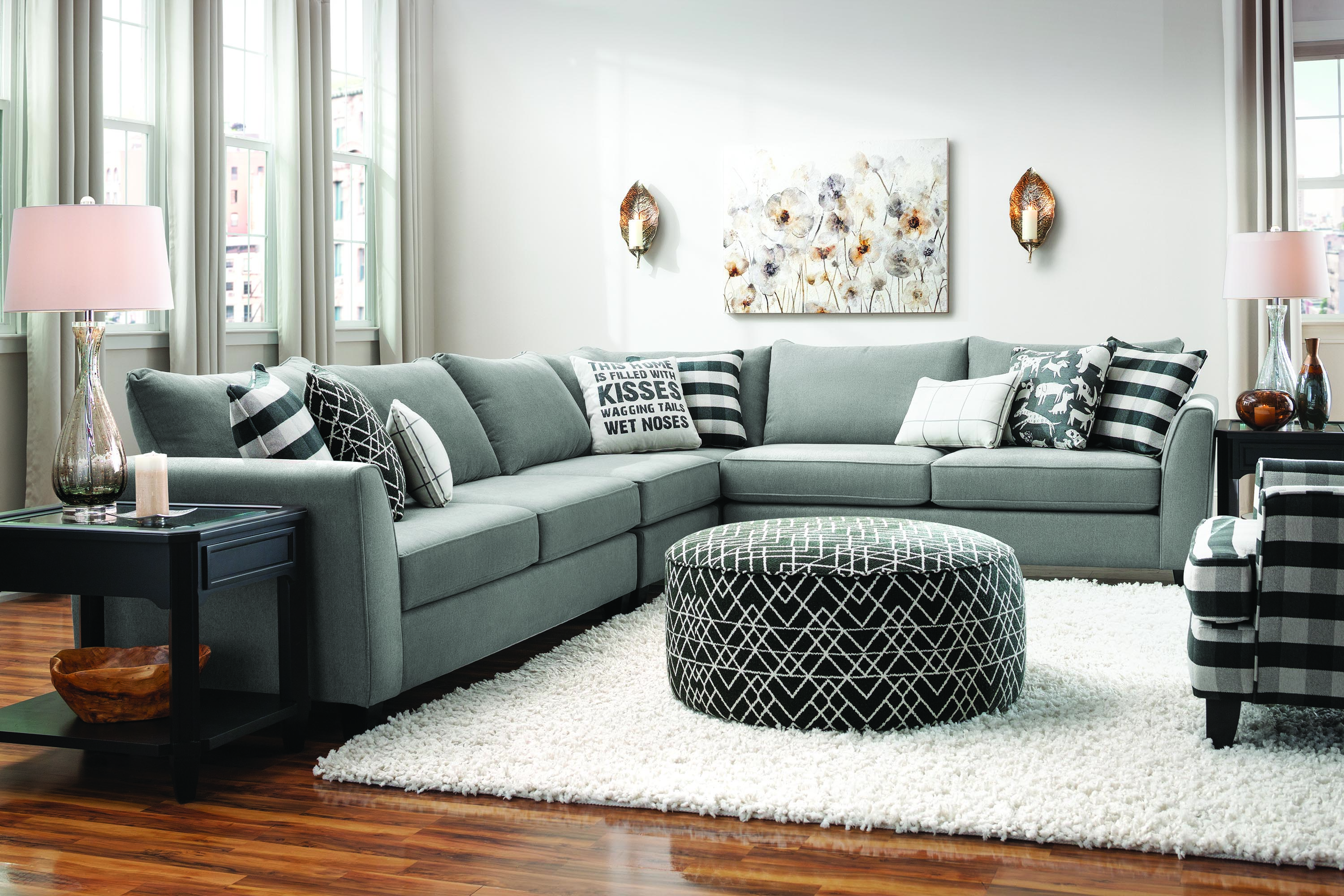
A room shot of Raymour & Flanigan furniture including the Daine sectional.

Raymour & Flanigan sells home furniture, including living room, dining room, and bedroom furniture and mattresses. Purple bedding products, such as hybrid mattresses, pillows and sheets, are available at all Raymour & Flanigan showrooms. Raymour & Flanigan is also a Tempur-Pedic mattress retailer, with a Tempur-Pedic Mattress Shop located at its Union Square showroom.

== Sustainability ==
Raymour & Flanigan built five dedicated recycling facilities and recycles nearly all of its packaging, which is equivalent to about 25 million pounds of material a year.

In 2022, Raymour & Flanigan partnered with Greenskies Clean Focus on solar projects for a New Jersey service center, showroom, and clearance center. The three projects are estimated to offset more than 90% of the electricity usage at each facility. These projects will also offset nearly 656 metric tons of carbon dioxide in the first year, and the green energy generated is equivalent to 136 homes' electricity use a year.

== Awards ==
In April 2001, Raymour & Flanigan Furniture was named "Retailer of the Year" by the National Home Furnishings Association. In 2004, Raymour & Flanigan Furniture received the "Retailer of the Year Award" from Furniture Today. In 2007, Raymour & Flanigan Furniture was named "Newsmaker of the Year" by Home Furnishings Business.

In 2009, the Greater New York Home Furnishings Association announced that the "Jerry Gans Memorial Award" would be awarded to the Goldberg family on behalf of the entire Raymour & Flanigan organization.

In 2013, the Goldberg family received the Spirit of Life Award from the City of Hope in recognition of Raymour & Flanigan's philanthropy and business leadership.

Raymour & Flanigan was voted "Best Furniture Store on Long Island" in 2016 and 2017 through the "Best of Long Island" program.

Raymour & Flanigan has earned the designation as a Great Place to Work-Certified Company every year since 2018 when it first began applying for the distinction.

In 2022, Raymour & Flanigan was named a Business of the Year award winner by CenterState in the More than 50 Employees category.

Neil Goldberg was inducted into the American Home Furnishings Hall of Fame Foundation Inc. in 2022.
