= Danville Airport =

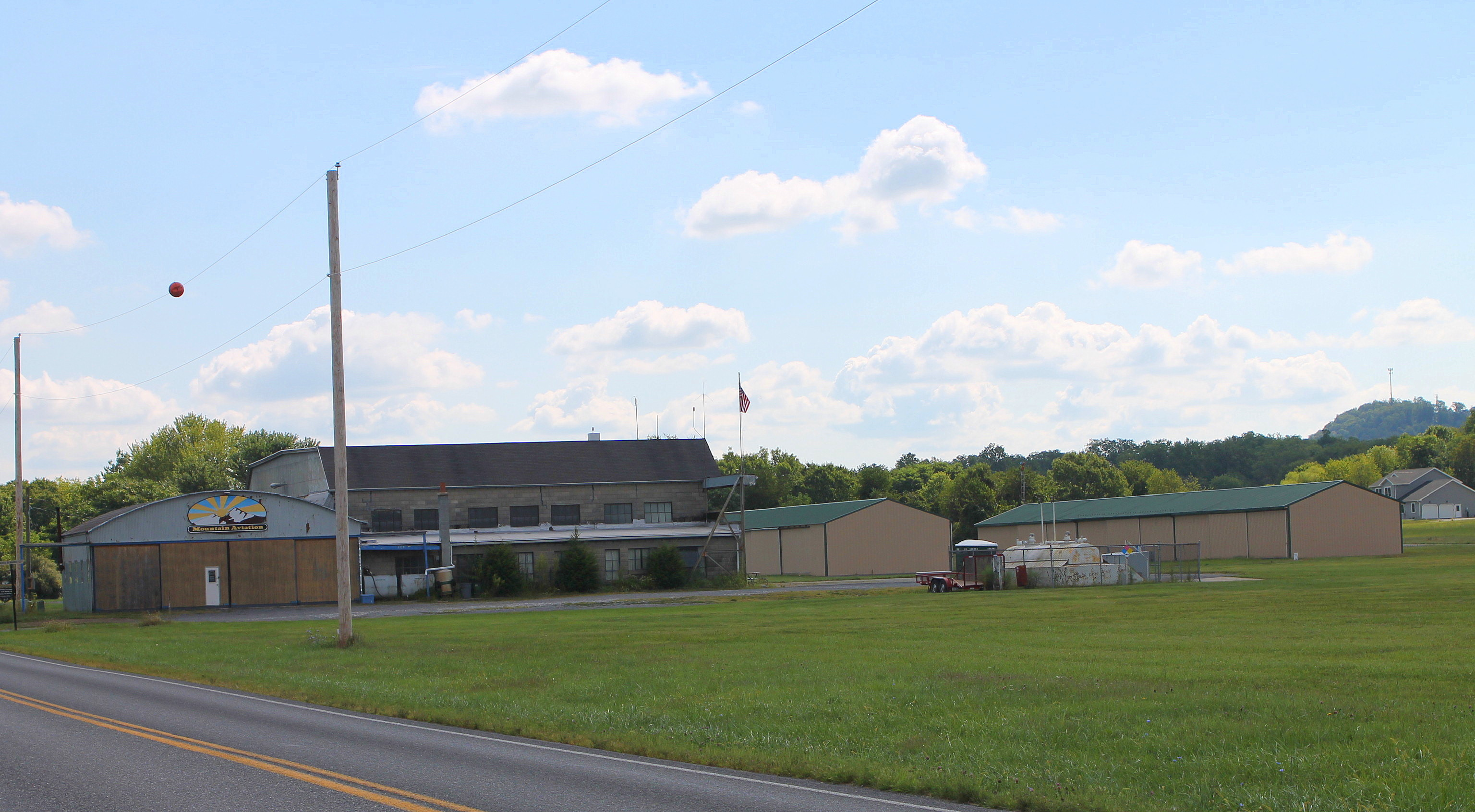
- IATA: none; ICAO: none; FAA LID: 8N8

Summary
- Airport type: Public
- Owner: Montour & Northumberland Cmsn.
- Serves: Danville, Pennsylvania
- Elevation AMSL: 559 ft (170 m)
- Coordinates: 40°57′05″N 076°38′34″W
- Interactive map of Danville Airport

Runways
Direction	Length		Surface
Direction	ft	m	Surface
9/27	3,000	914	Asphalt

Statistics (2008)
- Aircraft operations: 30,000
- Based aircraft: 38
- Source: Federal Aviation Administration

Danville Airport (FAA LID: 8N8) is a public use airport in Northumberland County, Pennsylvania, United States. It is located three nautical miles (6 km) southwest of the central business district of Danville, a borough in Montour County. The airport is owned by the Montour & Northumberland County Commissioners.

== Facilities and aircraft ==
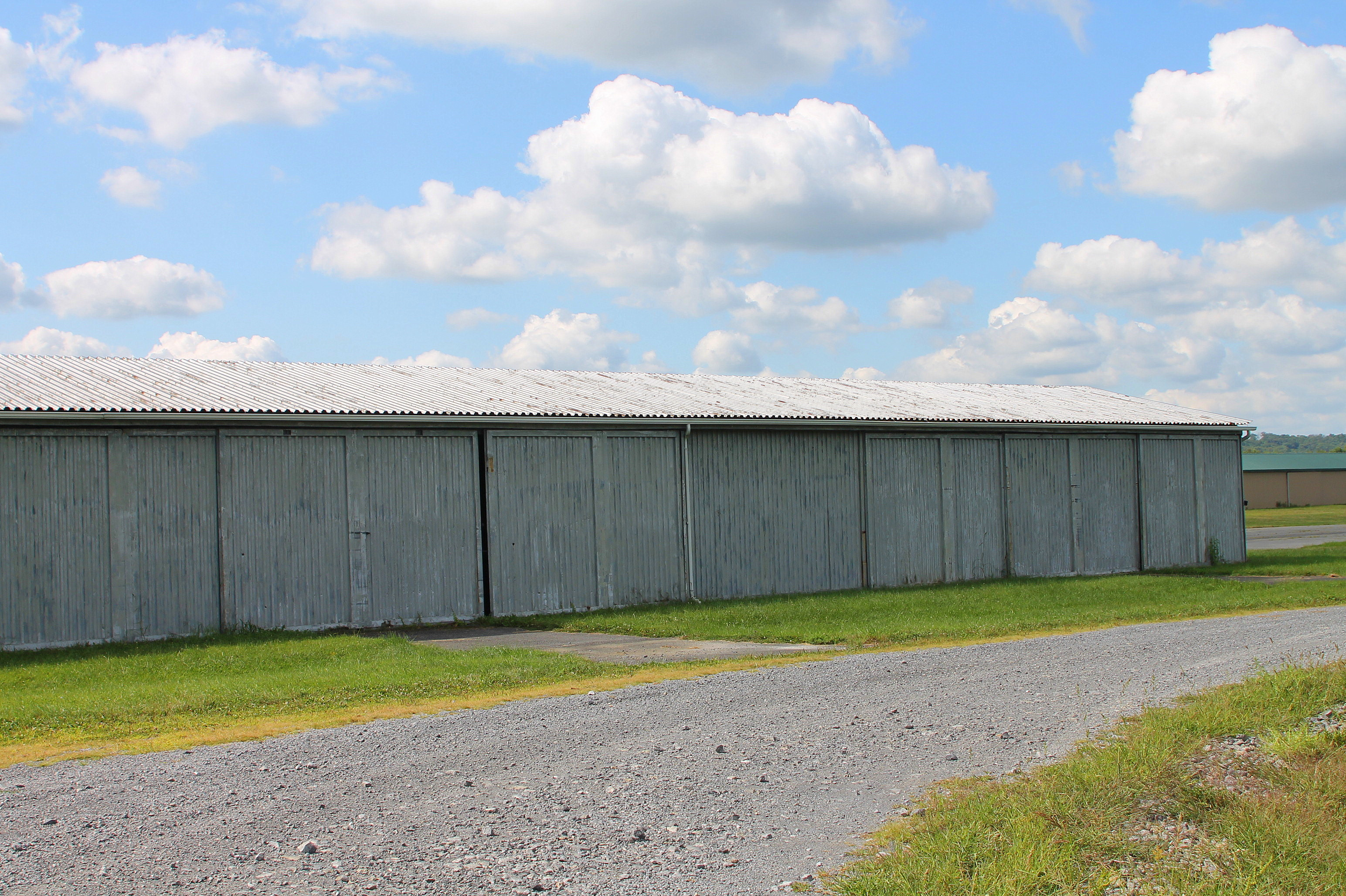
Hangar at Danville Airport

Danville Airport covers an area of 114 acres (46 ha) at an elevation of 559 feet (170 m) above mean sea level. It has one asphalt paved runway designated 9/27 which measures 3,000 by 60 feet (914 x 18 m).

The airport previously had two turf runways: 9/27 which measured 2,140 by 350 feet (652 m × 107 m) (located north of the new 9/27 asphalt runway) and 15/33 measuring 2,170 by 198 feet (661 m × 60 m).

For the 12-month period ending August 6, 2008, the airport had 30,000 general aviation aircraft operations, an average of 82 per day. At that time there were 38 aircraft based at this airport, all single-engine.

== See also ==
- List of airports in Pennsylvania
